

548001–548100 

|-bgcolor=#fefefe
| 548001 ||  || — || January 12, 2010 || Catalina || CSS ||  || align=right data-sort-value="0.86" | 860 m || 
|-id=002 bgcolor=#d6d6d6
| 548002 ||  || — || January 6, 2010 || Kitt Peak || Spacewatch ||  || align=right | 2.8 km || 
|-id=003 bgcolor=#fefefe
| 548003 ||  || — || January 4, 2010 || Kitt Peak || Spacewatch ||  || align=right data-sort-value="0.65" | 650 m || 
|-id=004 bgcolor=#fefefe
| 548004 ||  || — || December 20, 2009 || Mount Lemmon || Mount Lemmon Survey ||  || align=right | 1.1 km || 
|-id=005 bgcolor=#E9E9E9
| 548005 ||  || — || November 15, 2009 || Mount Lemmon || Mount Lemmon Survey ||  || align=right | 1.6 km || 
|-id=006 bgcolor=#fefefe
| 548006 ||  || — || September 25, 2005 || Kitt Peak || Spacewatch ||  || align=right data-sort-value="0.68" | 680 m || 
|-id=007 bgcolor=#d6d6d6
| 548007 ||  || — || December 18, 2009 || Mount Lemmon || Mount Lemmon Survey ||  || align=right | 2.7 km || 
|-id=008 bgcolor=#fefefe
| 548008 ||  || — || August 28, 2005 || Siding Spring || SSS ||  || align=right data-sort-value="0.86" | 860 m || 
|-id=009 bgcolor=#fefefe
| 548009 ||  || — || November 20, 2009 || Kitt Peak || Spacewatch ||  || align=right data-sort-value="0.72" | 720 m || 
|-id=010 bgcolor=#fefefe
| 548010 ||  || — || January 4, 2010 || Kitt Peak || Spacewatch ||  || align=right data-sort-value="0.78" | 780 m || 
|-id=011 bgcolor=#d6d6d6
| 548011 ||  || — || January 6, 2010 || Kitt Peak || Spacewatch ||  || align=right | 3.1 km || 
|-id=012 bgcolor=#E9E9E9
| 548012 ||  || — || February 20, 2006 || Mount Lemmon || Mount Lemmon Survey ||  || align=right | 1.4 km || 
|-id=013 bgcolor=#d6d6d6
| 548013 ||  || — || January 8, 2010 || Kitt Peak || Spacewatch ||  || align=right | 3.4 km || 
|-id=014 bgcolor=#d6d6d6
| 548014 ||  || — || September 29, 2009 || Kitt Peak || Spacewatch ||  || align=right | 1.8 km || 
|-id=015 bgcolor=#d6d6d6
| 548015 ||  || — || May 8, 2005 || Mount Lemmon || Mount Lemmon Survey ||  || align=right | 2.5 km || 
|-id=016 bgcolor=#d6d6d6
| 548016 ||  || — || August 28, 2014 || Haleakala || Pan-STARRS ||  || align=right | 2.9 km || 
|-id=017 bgcolor=#d6d6d6
| 548017 ||  || — || July 14, 2013 || Haleakala || Pan-STARRS ||  || align=right | 2.7 km || 
|-id=018 bgcolor=#E9E9E9
| 548018 ||  || — || December 27, 2009 || Kitt Peak || Spacewatch ||  || align=right | 1.9 km || 
|-id=019 bgcolor=#E9E9E9
| 548019 ||  || — || June 11, 2015 || Haleakala || Pan-STARRS ||  || align=right | 1.1 km || 
|-id=020 bgcolor=#fefefe
| 548020 ||  || — || August 14, 2012 || Haleakala || Pan-STARRS ||  || align=right data-sort-value="0.71" | 710 m || 
|-id=021 bgcolor=#d6d6d6
| 548021 ||  || — || January 6, 2010 || Kitt Peak || Spacewatch ||  || align=right | 2.4 km || 
|-id=022 bgcolor=#fefefe
| 548022 ||  || — || January 12, 2010 || Mount Lemmon || Mount Lemmon Survey || H || align=right data-sort-value="0.78" | 780 m || 
|-id=023 bgcolor=#E9E9E9
| 548023 ||  || — || June 15, 2015 || Haleakala || Pan-STARRS ||  || align=right | 1.1 km || 
|-id=024 bgcolor=#d6d6d6
| 548024 ||  || — || July 14, 2013 || Haleakala || Pan-STARRS ||  || align=right | 2.5 km || 
|-id=025 bgcolor=#d6d6d6
| 548025 ||  || — || September 29, 2008 || Catalina || CSS ||  || align=right | 2.5 km || 
|-id=026 bgcolor=#d6d6d6
| 548026 ||  || — || April 6, 2011 || Mount Lemmon || Mount Lemmon Survey ||  || align=right | 2.1 km || 
|-id=027 bgcolor=#d6d6d6
| 548027 ||  || — || January 19, 2016 || Haleakala || Pan-STARRS ||  || align=right | 2.2 km || 
|-id=028 bgcolor=#d6d6d6
| 548028 ||  || — || January 8, 2010 || Kitt Peak || Spacewatch ||  || align=right | 2.5 km || 
|-id=029 bgcolor=#d6d6d6
| 548029 ||  || — || January 5, 2010 || Kitt Peak || Spacewatch ||  || align=right | 2.8 km || 
|-id=030 bgcolor=#d6d6d6
| 548030 ||  || — || January 12, 2010 || Mount Lemmon || Mount Lemmon Survey ||  || align=right | 2.4 km || 
|-id=031 bgcolor=#d6d6d6
| 548031 ||  || — || January 6, 2010 || Kitt Peak || Spacewatch ||  || align=right | 2.3 km || 
|-id=032 bgcolor=#d6d6d6
| 548032 Ensisheim ||  ||  || January 17, 2010 || Nogales || J.-C. Merlin ||  || align=right | 2.2 km || 
|-id=033 bgcolor=#d6d6d6
| 548033 ||  || — || October 8, 2012 || Haleakala || Pan-STARRS ||  || align=right | 3.7 km || 
|-id=034 bgcolor=#E9E9E9
| 548034 ||  || — || October 6, 2012 || Haleakala || Pan-STARRS ||  || align=right | 1.5 km || 
|-id=035 bgcolor=#fefefe
| 548035 ||  || — || February 3, 2010 || Marly || P. Kocher ||  || align=right data-sort-value="0.83" | 830 m || 
|-id=036 bgcolor=#d6d6d6
| 548036 ||  || — || January 11, 2010 || Kitt Peak || Spacewatch ||  || align=right | 2.5 km || 
|-id=037 bgcolor=#fefefe
| 548037 ||  || — || February 5, 2010 || Kitt Peak || Spacewatch ||  || align=right data-sort-value="0.71" | 710 m || 
|-id=038 bgcolor=#d6d6d6
| 548038 ||  || — || February 6, 2010 || Mount Lemmon || Mount Lemmon Survey ||  || align=right | 2.0 km || 
|-id=039 bgcolor=#fefefe
| 548039 ||  || — || December 8, 2005 || Kitt Peak || Spacewatch ||  || align=right data-sort-value="0.90" | 900 m || 
|-id=040 bgcolor=#E9E9E9
| 548040 ||  || — || January 30, 2006 || Kitt Peak || Spacewatch ||  || align=right data-sort-value="0.75" | 750 m || 
|-id=041 bgcolor=#d6d6d6
| 548041 ||  || — || January 6, 2010 || Kitt Peak || Spacewatch ||  || align=right | 4.2 km || 
|-id=042 bgcolor=#d6d6d6
| 548042 ||  || — || April 29, 2006 || Kitt Peak || Spacewatch ||  || align=right | 2.8 km || 
|-id=043 bgcolor=#fefefe
| 548043 ||  || — || July 16, 2004 || Cerro Tololo || Cerro Tololo Obs. ||  || align=right data-sort-value="0.75" | 750 m || 
|-id=044 bgcolor=#fefefe
| 548044 ||  || — || February 9, 2010 || Mount Lemmon || Mount Lemmon Survey ||  || align=right data-sort-value="0.71" | 710 m || 
|-id=045 bgcolor=#E9E9E9
| 548045 ||  || — || September 28, 2000 || Kitt Peak || Spacewatch ||  || align=right data-sort-value="0.78" | 780 m || 
|-id=046 bgcolor=#E9E9E9
| 548046 ||  || — || December 2, 2005 || Kitt Peak || L. H. Wasserman, R. Millis ||  || align=right | 1.1 km || 
|-id=047 bgcolor=#d6d6d6
| 548047 ||  || — || March 4, 2005 || Kitt Peak || Spacewatch ||  || align=right | 3.1 km || 
|-id=048 bgcolor=#d6d6d6
| 548048 ||  || — || February 10, 2010 || Kitt Peak || Spacewatch ||  || align=right | 2.7 km || 
|-id=049 bgcolor=#d6d6d6
| 548049 ||  || — || August 25, 2001 || Kitt Peak || Spacewatch ||  || align=right | 3.5 km || 
|-id=050 bgcolor=#fefefe
| 548050 ||  || — || February 10, 2010 || Kitt Peak || Spacewatch ||  || align=right data-sort-value="0.81" | 810 m || 
|-id=051 bgcolor=#d6d6d6
| 548051 ||  || — || February 10, 2010 || Kitt Peak || Spacewatch ||  || align=right | 2.4 km || 
|-id=052 bgcolor=#fefefe
| 548052 ||  || — || April 25, 2007 || Mount Lemmon || Mount Lemmon Survey ||  || align=right data-sort-value="0.82" | 820 m || 
|-id=053 bgcolor=#fefefe
| 548053 ||  || — || February 13, 2010 || Kitt Peak || Spacewatch ||  || align=right data-sort-value="0.62" | 620 m || 
|-id=054 bgcolor=#fefefe
| 548054 ||  || — || December 19, 2009 || Mount Lemmon || Mount Lemmon Survey ||  || align=right data-sort-value="0.75" | 750 m || 
|-id=055 bgcolor=#d6d6d6
| 548055 ||  || — || February 9, 2010 || Kitt Peak || Spacewatch ||  || align=right | 2.9 km || 
|-id=056 bgcolor=#d6d6d6
| 548056 ||  || — || December 25, 2009 || Kitt Peak || Spacewatch ||  || align=right | 2.1 km || 
|-id=057 bgcolor=#fefefe
| 548057 ||  || — || February 9, 2010 || Mount Lemmon || Mount Lemmon Survey ||  || align=right data-sort-value="0.82" | 820 m || 
|-id=058 bgcolor=#fefefe
| 548058 ||  || — || February 9, 2010 || Kitt Peak || Spacewatch || PHO || align=right data-sort-value="0.71" | 710 m || 
|-id=059 bgcolor=#d6d6d6
| 548059 ||  || — || February 10, 2010 || Kitt Peak || Spacewatch ||  || align=right | 2.7 km || 
|-id=060 bgcolor=#E9E9E9
| 548060 ||  || — || March 6, 2006 || Kitt Peak || Spacewatch ||  || align=right data-sort-value="0.78" | 780 m || 
|-id=061 bgcolor=#d6d6d6
| 548061 ||  || — || October 26, 2008 || Mount Lemmon || Mount Lemmon Survey ||  || align=right | 3.1 km || 
|-id=062 bgcolor=#fefefe
| 548062 ||  || — || February 13, 2010 || Mount Lemmon || Mount Lemmon Survey ||  || align=right data-sort-value="0.75" | 750 m || 
|-id=063 bgcolor=#d6d6d6
| 548063 ||  || — || November 19, 2003 || Kitt Peak || Spacewatch ||  || align=right | 2.3 km || 
|-id=064 bgcolor=#d6d6d6
| 548064 ||  || — || February 13, 2010 || Mount Lemmon || Mount Lemmon Survey ||  || align=right | 2.8 km || 
|-id=065 bgcolor=#fefefe
| 548065 ||  || — || October 29, 2005 || Kitt Peak || Spacewatch ||  || align=right data-sort-value="0.78" | 780 m || 
|-id=066 bgcolor=#fefefe
| 548066 ||  || — || September 23, 2008 || Kitt Peak || Spacewatch ||  || align=right data-sort-value="0.79" | 790 m || 
|-id=067 bgcolor=#d6d6d6
| 548067 ||  || — || February 13, 2010 || Mount Lemmon || Mount Lemmon Survey ||  || align=right | 2.9 km || 
|-id=068 bgcolor=#d6d6d6
| 548068 ||  || — || February 13, 2010 || Mount Lemmon || Mount Lemmon Survey ||  || align=right | 2.7 km || 
|-id=069 bgcolor=#d6d6d6
| 548069 ||  || — || February 13, 2010 || Mount Lemmon || Mount Lemmon Survey ||  || align=right | 2.7 km || 
|-id=070 bgcolor=#fefefe
| 548070 ||  || — || November 1, 2005 || Mount Lemmon || Mount Lemmon Survey ||  || align=right data-sort-value="0.68" | 680 m || 
|-id=071 bgcolor=#d6d6d6
| 548071 ||  || — || September 5, 2008 || Kitt Peak || Spacewatch ||  || align=right | 2.0 km || 
|-id=072 bgcolor=#d6d6d6
| 548072 ||  || — || February 14, 2010 || Kitt Peak || Spacewatch ||  || align=right | 3.1 km || 
|-id=073 bgcolor=#fefefe
| 548073 ||  || — || February 14, 2010 || Mount Lemmon || Mount Lemmon Survey ||  || align=right data-sort-value="0.82" | 820 m || 
|-id=074 bgcolor=#fefefe
| 548074 ||  || — || April 29, 2003 || Kitt Peak || Spacewatch ||  || align=right data-sort-value="0.98" | 980 m || 
|-id=075 bgcolor=#d6d6d6
| 548075 ||  || — || February 14, 2010 || Mount Lemmon || Mount Lemmon Survey ||  || align=right | 2.9 km || 
|-id=076 bgcolor=#fefefe
| 548076 ||  || — || October 25, 2005 || Mount Lemmon || Mount Lemmon Survey ||  || align=right data-sort-value="0.63" | 630 m || 
|-id=077 bgcolor=#d6d6d6
| 548077 ||  || — || February 14, 2010 || Mount Lemmon || Mount Lemmon Survey ||  || align=right | 2.4 km || 
|-id=078 bgcolor=#d6d6d6
| 548078 ||  || — || February 14, 2010 || Mount Lemmon || Mount Lemmon Survey ||  || align=right | 2.0 km || 
|-id=079 bgcolor=#d6d6d6
| 548079 ||  || — || February 14, 2010 || Mount Lemmon || Mount Lemmon Survey ||  || align=right | 2.4 km || 
|-id=080 bgcolor=#d6d6d6
| 548080 ||  || — || March 11, 2005 || Kitt Peak || Spacewatch ||  || align=right | 2.2 km || 
|-id=081 bgcolor=#fefefe
| 548081 ||  || — || January 12, 2010 || Mount Lemmon || Mount Lemmon Survey ||  || align=right data-sort-value="0.68" | 680 m || 
|-id=082 bgcolor=#d6d6d6
| 548082 ||  || — || February 14, 2010 || Kitt Peak || Spacewatch ||  || align=right | 2.8 km || 
|-id=083 bgcolor=#fefefe
| 548083 ||  || — || April 15, 2007 || Kitt Peak || Spacewatch ||  || align=right data-sort-value="0.82" | 820 m || 
|-id=084 bgcolor=#d6d6d6
| 548084 ||  || — || February 14, 2010 || Mount Lemmon || Mount Lemmon Survey ||  || align=right | 2.2 km || 
|-id=085 bgcolor=#d6d6d6
| 548085 ||  || — || February 14, 2010 || Mount Lemmon || Mount Lemmon Survey ||  || align=right | 2.1 km || 
|-id=086 bgcolor=#fefefe
| 548086 ||  || — || December 28, 2005 || Mount Lemmon || Mount Lemmon Survey ||  || align=right data-sort-value="0.52" | 520 m || 
|-id=087 bgcolor=#fefefe
| 548087 ||  || — || November 25, 2005 || Kitt Peak || Spacewatch ||  || align=right data-sort-value="0.57" | 570 m || 
|-id=088 bgcolor=#E9E9E9
| 548088 ||  || — || October 27, 2008 || Kitt Peak || Spacewatch ||  || align=right | 1.3 km || 
|-id=089 bgcolor=#fefefe
| 548089 ||  || — || April 10, 2003 || Kitt Peak || Spacewatch ||  || align=right data-sort-value="0.75" | 750 m || 
|-id=090 bgcolor=#d6d6d6
| 548090 ||  || — || February 14, 2010 || Kitt Peak || Spacewatch ||  || align=right | 2.8 km || 
|-id=091 bgcolor=#fefefe
| 548091 ||  || — || December 6, 2005 || Kitt Peak || Spacewatch ||  || align=right data-sort-value="0.68" | 680 m || 
|-id=092 bgcolor=#E9E9E9
| 548092 ||  || — || November 7, 2005 || Mauna Kea || Mauna Kea Obs. ||  || align=right data-sort-value="0.60" | 600 m || 
|-id=093 bgcolor=#d6d6d6
| 548093 ||  || — || February 14, 2010 || Mount Lemmon || Mount Lemmon Survey ||  || align=right | 1.9 km || 
|-id=094 bgcolor=#d6d6d6
| 548094 ||  || — || February 14, 2010 || Kitt Peak || Spacewatch ||  || align=right | 3.2 km || 
|-id=095 bgcolor=#d6d6d6
| 548095 ||  || — || February 14, 2010 || Mount Lemmon || Mount Lemmon Survey ||  || align=right | 2.4 km || 
|-id=096 bgcolor=#d6d6d6
| 548096 ||  || — || November 7, 2008 || Mount Lemmon || Mount Lemmon Survey ||  || align=right | 2.2 km || 
|-id=097 bgcolor=#d6d6d6
| 548097 ||  || — || September 5, 2007 || Mount Lemmon || Mount Lemmon Survey ||  || align=right | 2.9 km || 
|-id=098 bgcolor=#d6d6d6
| 548098 ||  || — || February 14, 2010 || Mount Lemmon || Mount Lemmon Survey ||  || align=right | 2.4 km || 
|-id=099 bgcolor=#d6d6d6
| 548099 ||  || — || February 14, 2010 || Mount Lemmon || Mount Lemmon Survey ||  || align=right | 2.3 km || 
|-id=100 bgcolor=#d6d6d6
| 548100 ||  || — || September 9, 2007 || Kitt Peak || Spacewatch ||  || align=right | 2.7 km || 
|}

548101–548200 

|-bgcolor=#fefefe
| 548101 ||  || — || February 14, 2010 || Mount Lemmon || Mount Lemmon Survey ||  || align=right data-sort-value="0.68" | 680 m || 
|-id=102 bgcolor=#d6d6d6
| 548102 ||  || — || February 14, 2010 || Mount Lemmon || Mount Lemmon Survey ||  || align=right | 3.1 km || 
|-id=103 bgcolor=#d6d6d6
| 548103 ||  || — || February 15, 2010 || Mount Lemmon || Mount Lemmon Survey ||  || align=right | 2.8 km || 
|-id=104 bgcolor=#fefefe
| 548104 ||  || — || February 14, 2010 || Mount Lemmon || Mount Lemmon Survey ||  || align=right data-sort-value="0.78" | 780 m || 
|-id=105 bgcolor=#d6d6d6
| 548105 ||  || — || March 8, 2005 || Mount Lemmon || Mount Lemmon Survey ||  || align=right | 2.7 km || 
|-id=106 bgcolor=#d6d6d6
| 548106 ||  || — || February 15, 2010 || Mount Lemmon || Mount Lemmon Survey ||  || align=right | 2.3 km || 
|-id=107 bgcolor=#fefefe
| 548107 ||  || — || December 2, 2005 || Mount Lemmon || Mount Lemmon Survey ||  || align=right data-sort-value="0.65" | 650 m || 
|-id=108 bgcolor=#d6d6d6
| 548108 ||  || — || February 15, 2010 || Mount Lemmon || Mount Lemmon Survey ||  || align=right | 2.2 km || 
|-id=109 bgcolor=#d6d6d6
| 548109 ||  || — || February 15, 2010 || Mount Lemmon || Mount Lemmon Survey ||  || align=right | 2.4 km || 
|-id=110 bgcolor=#fefefe
| 548110 ||  || — || August 13, 2004 || Cerro Tololo || Cerro Tololo Obs. ||  || align=right data-sort-value="0.61" | 610 m || 
|-id=111 bgcolor=#fefefe
| 548111 ||  || — || January 12, 2010 || Kitt Peak || Spacewatch ||  || align=right data-sort-value="0.59" | 590 m || 
|-id=112 bgcolor=#d6d6d6
| 548112 ||  || — || March 16, 2005 || Mount Lemmon || Mount Lemmon Survey ||  || align=right | 2.4 km || 
|-id=113 bgcolor=#d6d6d6
| 548113 ||  || — || January 6, 2010 || Kitt Peak || Spacewatch ||  || align=right | 2.9 km || 
|-id=114 bgcolor=#d6d6d6
| 548114 ||  || — || September 23, 2008 || Kitt Peak || Spacewatch ||  || align=right | 1.9 km || 
|-id=115 bgcolor=#fefefe
| 548115 ||  || — || September 7, 2008 || Mount Lemmon || Mount Lemmon Survey ||  || align=right data-sort-value="0.86" | 860 m || 
|-id=116 bgcolor=#fefefe
| 548116 ||  || — || February 13, 2010 || Mount Lemmon || Mount Lemmon Survey ||  || align=right | 1.0 km || 
|-id=117 bgcolor=#fefefe
| 548117 ||  || — || January 4, 2006 || Kitt Peak || Spacewatch ||  || align=right data-sort-value="0.71" | 710 m || 
|-id=118 bgcolor=#fefefe
| 548118 ||  || — || February 14, 2010 || Mount Lemmon || Mount Lemmon Survey ||  || align=right data-sort-value="0.82" | 820 m || 
|-id=119 bgcolor=#d6d6d6
| 548119 ||  || — || February 14, 2010 || Mount Lemmon || Mount Lemmon Survey ||  || align=right | 2.5 km || 
|-id=120 bgcolor=#d6d6d6
| 548120 ||  || — || February 14, 2010 || Kitt Peak || Spacewatch ||  || align=right | 2.9 km || 
|-id=121 bgcolor=#d6d6d6
| 548121 ||  || — || February 14, 2010 || Kitt Peak || Spacewatch ||  || align=right | 2.8 km || 
|-id=122 bgcolor=#d6d6d6
| 548122 ||  || — || February 14, 2010 || Kitt Peak || Spacewatch ||  || align=right | 2.6 km || 
|-id=123 bgcolor=#fefefe
| 548123 ||  || — || April 8, 2003 || Kitt Peak || Spacewatch ||  || align=right data-sort-value="0.71" | 710 m || 
|-id=124 bgcolor=#d6d6d6
| 548124 ||  || — || June 19, 2006 || Mount Lemmon || Mount Lemmon Survey ||  || align=right | 3.1 km || 
|-id=125 bgcolor=#fefefe
| 548125 ||  || — || January 8, 2006 || Kitt Peak || Spacewatch ||  || align=right data-sort-value="0.68" | 680 m || 
|-id=126 bgcolor=#E9E9E9
| 548126 ||  || — || February 15, 2010 || Kitt Peak || Spacewatch ||  || align=right | 1.5 km || 
|-id=127 bgcolor=#d6d6d6
| 548127 ||  || — || February 9, 2010 || Kitt Peak || Spacewatch ||  || align=right | 3.1 km || 
|-id=128 bgcolor=#fefefe
| 548128 ||  || — || February 9, 2010 || Kitt Peak || Spacewatch ||  || align=right data-sort-value="0.68" | 680 m || 
|-id=129 bgcolor=#E9E9E9
| 548129 ||  || — || March 5, 2006 || Mount Lemmon || Mount Lemmon Survey ||  || align=right data-sort-value="0.73" | 730 m || 
|-id=130 bgcolor=#d6d6d6
| 548130 ||  || — || February 9, 2010 || Mount Lemmon || Mount Lemmon Survey ||  || align=right | 2.2 km || 
|-id=131 bgcolor=#d6d6d6
| 548131 ||  || — || August 9, 2007 || Kitt Peak || Spacewatch ||  || align=right | 3.2 km || 
|-id=132 bgcolor=#fefefe
| 548132 ||  || — || February 10, 2010 || Kitt Peak || Spacewatch ||  || align=right data-sort-value="0.57" | 570 m || 
|-id=133 bgcolor=#d6d6d6
| 548133 ||  || — || February 14, 2010 || Kitt Peak || Spacewatch ||  || align=right | 3.2 km || 
|-id=134 bgcolor=#d6d6d6
| 548134 ||  || — || September 30, 2003 || Kitt Peak || Spacewatch ||  || align=right | 2.7 km || 
|-id=135 bgcolor=#E9E9E9
| 548135 ||  || — || January 8, 2010 || Mount Lemmon || Mount Lemmon Survey ||  || align=right | 1.3 km || 
|-id=136 bgcolor=#fefefe
| 548136 ||  || — || January 11, 2010 || Kitt Peak || Spacewatch ||  || align=right data-sort-value="0.78" | 780 m || 
|-id=137 bgcolor=#d6d6d6
| 548137 ||  || — || January 18, 2015 || Mount Lemmon || Mount Lemmon Survey ||  || align=right | 2.9 km || 
|-id=138 bgcolor=#fefefe
| 548138 ||  || — || February 9, 2010 || Mount Lemmon || Mount Lemmon Survey || H || align=right data-sort-value="0.68" | 680 m || 
|-id=139 bgcolor=#d6d6d6
| 548139 ||  || — || February 14, 2010 || Catalina || CSS ||  || align=right | 3.9 km || 
|-id=140 bgcolor=#d6d6d6
| 548140 ||  || — || March 9, 2015 || Mount Lemmon || Mount Lemmon Survey ||  || align=right | 3.2 km || 
|-id=141 bgcolor=#C7FF8F
| 548141 ||  || — || February 4, 2010 || Haleakala || Pan-STARRS || centaur || align=right | 106 km || 
|-id=142 bgcolor=#fefefe
| 548142 ||  || — || February 14, 2010 || Mount Lemmon || Mount Lemmon Survey ||  || align=right data-sort-value="0.78" | 780 m || 
|-id=143 bgcolor=#d6d6d6
| 548143 ||  || — || February 5, 2016 || Haleakala || Pan-STARRS ||  || align=right | 3.1 km || 
|-id=144 bgcolor=#E9E9E9
| 548144 ||  || — || October 12, 2016 || Mount Lemmon || Mount Lemmon Survey ||  || align=right | 1.3 km || 
|-id=145 bgcolor=#d6d6d6
| 548145 ||  || — || September 12, 2013 || Kitt Peak || Spacewatch || 7:4 || align=right | 3.2 km || 
|-id=146 bgcolor=#fefefe
| 548146 ||  || — || July 2, 2011 || Kitt Peak || Spacewatch || H || align=right data-sort-value="0.57" | 570 m || 
|-id=147 bgcolor=#d6d6d6
| 548147 ||  || — || November 23, 2014 || Haleakala || Pan-STARRS ||  || align=right | 2.3 km || 
|-id=148 bgcolor=#d6d6d6
| 548148 ||  || — || June 18, 2018 || Haleakala || Pan-STARRS ||  || align=right | 2.7 km || 
|-id=149 bgcolor=#fefefe
| 548149 ||  || — || July 28, 2011 || Haleakala || Pan-STARRS ||  || align=right data-sort-value="0.90" | 900 m || 
|-id=150 bgcolor=#d6d6d6
| 548150 ||  || — || August 14, 2013 || Haleakala || Pan-STARRS ||  || align=right | 2.7 km || 
|-id=151 bgcolor=#d6d6d6
| 548151 ||  || — || November 20, 2014 || Haleakala || Pan-STARRS ||  || align=right | 2.2 km || 
|-id=152 bgcolor=#d6d6d6
| 548152 ||  || — || February 10, 2010 || Kitt Peak || Spacewatch ||  || align=right | 2.5 km || 
|-id=153 bgcolor=#fefefe
| 548153 ||  || — || February 15, 2010 || Mount Lemmon || Mount Lemmon Survey ||  || align=right data-sort-value="0.59" | 590 m || 
|-id=154 bgcolor=#d6d6d6
| 548154 ||  || — || February 17, 2010 || Catalina || CSS ||  || align=right | 2.4 km || 
|-id=155 bgcolor=#d6d6d6
| 548155 ||  || — || February 16, 2010 || Kitt Peak || Spacewatch ||  || align=right | 2.4 km || 
|-id=156 bgcolor=#d6d6d6
| 548156 ||  || — || April 26, 2000 || Kitt Peak || Spacewatch ||  || align=right | 2.2 km || 
|-id=157 bgcolor=#fefefe
| 548157 ||  || — || November 3, 2005 || Kitt Peak || Spacewatch ||  || align=right data-sort-value="0.57" | 570 m || 
|-id=158 bgcolor=#d6d6d6
| 548158 ||  || — || February 16, 2010 || Kitt Peak || Spacewatch ||  || align=right | 3.1 km || 
|-id=159 bgcolor=#fefefe
| 548159 ||  || — || February 16, 2010 || Mount Lemmon || Mount Lemmon Survey || NYS || align=right data-sort-value="0.58" | 580 m || 
|-id=160 bgcolor=#E9E9E9
| 548160 ||  || — || February 16, 2010 || Kitt Peak || Spacewatch ||  || align=right | 1.6 km || 
|-id=161 bgcolor=#d6d6d6
| 548161 ||  || — || February 16, 2010 || Kitt Peak || Spacewatch ||  || align=right | 2.3 km || 
|-id=162 bgcolor=#d6d6d6
| 548162 ||  || — || September 10, 2007 || Mount Lemmon || Mount Lemmon Survey ||  || align=right | 3.4 km || 
|-id=163 bgcolor=#d6d6d6
| 548163 ||  || — || February 1, 2005 || Kitt Peak || Spacewatch ||  || align=right | 2.4 km || 
|-id=164 bgcolor=#fefefe
| 548164 ||  || — || February 16, 2010 || Kitt Peak || Spacewatch ||  || align=right data-sort-value="0.75" | 750 m || 
|-id=165 bgcolor=#d6d6d6
| 548165 ||  || — || February 17, 2010 || Kitt Peak || Spacewatch ||  || align=right | 2.3 km || 
|-id=166 bgcolor=#d6d6d6
| 548166 ||  || — || September 9, 2007 || Kitt Peak || Spacewatch ||  || align=right | 2.8 km || 
|-id=167 bgcolor=#d6d6d6
| 548167 ||  || — || October 26, 2008 || Kitt Peak || Spacewatch ||  || align=right | 2.3 km || 
|-id=168 bgcolor=#d6d6d6
| 548168 ||  || — || February 6, 2010 || Kitt Peak || Spacewatch ||  || align=right | 2.1 km || 
|-id=169 bgcolor=#fefefe
| 548169 ||  || — || February 17, 2010 || Kitt Peak || Spacewatch ||  || align=right data-sort-value="0.78" | 780 m || 
|-id=170 bgcolor=#d6d6d6
| 548170 ||  || — || January 12, 2010 || Kitt Peak || Spacewatch ||  || align=right | 3.1 km || 
|-id=171 bgcolor=#fefefe
| 548171 ||  || — || January 11, 2010 || Kitt Peak || Spacewatch ||  || align=right data-sort-value="0.68" | 680 m || 
|-id=172 bgcolor=#d6d6d6
| 548172 ||  || — || March 17, 2010 || Kitt Peak || Spacewatch ||  || align=right | 2.9 km || 
|-id=173 bgcolor=#d6d6d6
| 548173 ||  || — || September 14, 2012 || Mount Lemmon || Mount Lemmon Survey ||  || align=right | 4.4 km || 
|-id=174 bgcolor=#d6d6d6
| 548174 ||  || — || January 17, 2015 || Haleakala || Pan-STARRS ||  || align=right | 2.9 km || 
|-id=175 bgcolor=#fefefe
| 548175 ||  || — || October 6, 2012 || Kitt Peak || Spacewatch ||  || align=right data-sort-value="0.98" | 980 m || 
|-id=176 bgcolor=#fefefe
| 548176 ||  || — || November 7, 2012 || Nogales || M. Schwartz, P. R. Holvorcem ||  || align=right data-sort-value="0.75" | 750 m || 
|-id=177 bgcolor=#fefefe
| 548177 ||  || — || November 12, 2012 || Mount Lemmon || Mount Lemmon Survey ||  || align=right data-sort-value="0.61" | 610 m || 
|-id=178 bgcolor=#fefefe
| 548178 ||  || — || October 20, 2012 || Haleakala || Pan-STARRS ||  || align=right data-sort-value="0.78" | 780 m || 
|-id=179 bgcolor=#d6d6d6
| 548179 ||  || — || February 17, 2010 || Kitt Peak || Spacewatch ||  || align=right | 2.7 km || 
|-id=180 bgcolor=#fefefe
| 548180 ||  || — || February 19, 2010 || Mount Lemmon || Mount Lemmon Survey || H || align=right data-sort-value="0.62" | 620 m || 
|-id=181 bgcolor=#d6d6d6
| 548181 ||  || — || August 12, 2013 || Haleakala || Pan-STARRS ||  || align=right | 2.2 km || 
|-id=182 bgcolor=#d6d6d6
| 548182 ||  || — || February 17, 2010 || Kitt Peak || Spacewatch ||  || align=right | 2.8 km || 
|-id=183 bgcolor=#fefefe
| 548183 ||  || — || September 9, 2015 || Haleakala || Pan-STARRS ||  || align=right data-sort-value="0.57" | 570 m || 
|-id=184 bgcolor=#E9E9E9
| 548184 ||  || — || February 17, 2010 || Kitt Peak || Spacewatch ||  || align=right | 1.0 km || 
|-id=185 bgcolor=#d6d6d6
| 548185 ||  || — || September 9, 2007 || Kitt Peak || Spacewatch ||  || align=right | 2.8 km || 
|-id=186 bgcolor=#d6d6d6
| 548186 ||  || — || October 27, 2008 || Mount Lemmon || Mount Lemmon Survey ||  || align=right | 2.3 km || 
|-id=187 bgcolor=#d6d6d6
| 548187 ||  || — || March 16, 2005 || Kitt Peak || Spacewatch ||  || align=right | 2.4 km || 
|-id=188 bgcolor=#fefefe
| 548188 ||  || — || April 25, 2003 || Kitt Peak || Spacewatch ||  || align=right data-sort-value="0.90" | 900 m || 
|-id=189 bgcolor=#fefefe
| 548189 ||  || — || October 31, 2005 || Mauna Kea || Mauna Kea Obs. || MAS || align=right data-sort-value="0.94" | 940 m || 
|-id=190 bgcolor=#d6d6d6
| 548190 ||  || — || October 29, 2008 || Kitt Peak || Spacewatch ||  || align=right | 2.5 km || 
|-id=191 bgcolor=#fefefe
| 548191 ||  || — || March 12, 2010 || Mount Lemmon || Mount Lemmon Survey ||  || align=right data-sort-value="0.71" | 710 m || 
|-id=192 bgcolor=#d6d6d6
| 548192 ||  || — || February 14, 2010 || Mount Lemmon || Mount Lemmon Survey ||  || align=right | 3.4 km || 
|-id=193 bgcolor=#d6d6d6
| 548193 ||  || — || March 11, 2010 || Plana || F. Fratev ||  || align=right | 2.8 km || 
|-id=194 bgcolor=#fefefe
| 548194 ||  || — || April 7, 1999 || Kitt Peak || Spacewatch ||  || align=right data-sort-value="0.98" | 980 m || 
|-id=195 bgcolor=#fefefe
| 548195 ||  || — || March 13, 2010 || Catalina || CSS ||  || align=right data-sort-value="0.90" | 900 m || 
|-id=196 bgcolor=#d6d6d6
| 548196 ||  || — || September 13, 2007 || Kitt Peak || Spacewatch ||  || align=right | 3.5 km || 
|-id=197 bgcolor=#d6d6d6
| 548197 ||  || — || October 27, 2008 || Mount Lemmon || Mount Lemmon Survey ||  || align=right | 1.9 km || 
|-id=198 bgcolor=#d6d6d6
| 548198 ||  || — || March 12, 2010 || Catalina || CSS ||  || align=right | 2.7 km || 
|-id=199 bgcolor=#d6d6d6
| 548199 ||  || — || March 12, 2010 || Mount Lemmon || Mount Lemmon Survey ||  || align=right | 2.5 km || 
|-id=200 bgcolor=#d6d6d6
| 548200 ||  || — || March 12, 2010 || Mount Lemmon || Mount Lemmon Survey || Tj (2.94) || align=right | 3.5 km || 
|}

548201–548300 

|-bgcolor=#d6d6d6
| 548201 ||  || — || March 12, 2010 || Catalina || CSS ||  || align=right | 2.0 km || 
|-id=202 bgcolor=#fefefe
| 548202 ||  || — || March 12, 2010 || Kitt Peak || Spacewatch ||  || align=right data-sort-value="0.66" | 660 m || 
|-id=203 bgcolor=#fefefe
| 548203 ||  || — || March 12, 2010 || Kitt Peak || Spacewatch ||  || align=right data-sort-value="0.71" | 710 m || 
|-id=204 bgcolor=#d6d6d6
| 548204 ||  || — || February 15, 2010 || Kitt Peak || Spacewatch ||  || align=right | 2.4 km || 
|-id=205 bgcolor=#d6d6d6
| 548205 ||  || — || February 6, 2010 || Kitt Peak || Spacewatch ||  || align=right | 3.5 km || 
|-id=206 bgcolor=#fefefe
| 548206 ||  || — || October 8, 2008 || Kitt Peak || Spacewatch ||  || align=right data-sort-value="0.78" | 780 m || 
|-id=207 bgcolor=#d6d6d6
| 548207 ||  || — || March 12, 2010 || Mount Lemmon || Mount Lemmon Survey ||  || align=right | 2.6 km || 
|-id=208 bgcolor=#d6d6d6
| 548208 ||  || — || February 14, 2004 || Kitt Peak || Spacewatch ||  || align=right | 2.8 km || 
|-id=209 bgcolor=#fefefe
| 548209 ||  || — || January 11, 2010 || Kitt Peak || Spacewatch ||  || align=right data-sort-value="0.75" | 750 m || 
|-id=210 bgcolor=#fefefe
| 548210 ||  || — || February 16, 2010 || Mount Lemmon || Mount Lemmon Survey ||  || align=right data-sort-value="0.71" | 710 m || 
|-id=211 bgcolor=#d6d6d6
| 548211 ||  || — || September 10, 2007 || Mount Lemmon || Mount Lemmon Survey ||  || align=right | 2.1 km || 
|-id=212 bgcolor=#fefefe
| 548212 ||  || — || March 13, 2010 || Catalina || CSS ||  || align=right data-sort-value="0.90" | 900 m || 
|-id=213 bgcolor=#d6d6d6
| 548213 ||  || — || March 14, 2010 || Mount Lemmon || Mount Lemmon Survey ||  || align=right | 2.4 km || 
|-id=214 bgcolor=#d6d6d6
| 548214 ||  || — || October 20, 2007 || Kitt Peak || Spacewatch ||  || align=right | 2.6 km || 
|-id=215 bgcolor=#d6d6d6
| 548215 ||  || — || September 11, 2002 || Haleakala || AMOS || EOS || align=right | 2.4 km || 
|-id=216 bgcolor=#fefefe
| 548216 ||  || — || February 13, 2010 || Mount Lemmon || Mount Lemmon Survey ||  || align=right data-sort-value="0.59" | 590 m || 
|-id=217 bgcolor=#fefefe
| 548217 ||  || — || January 7, 2006 || Kitt Peak || Spacewatch ||  || align=right data-sort-value="0.94" | 940 m || 
|-id=218 bgcolor=#fefefe
| 548218 ||  || — || March 14, 2010 || Mount Lemmon || Mount Lemmon Survey ||  || align=right data-sort-value="0.78" | 780 m || 
|-id=219 bgcolor=#d6d6d6
| 548219 ||  || — || March 14, 2010 || Mount Lemmon || Mount Lemmon Survey ||  || align=right | 2.7 km || 
|-id=220 bgcolor=#d6d6d6
| 548220 ||  || — || March 14, 2010 || Mount Lemmon || Mount Lemmon Survey ||  || align=right | 2.9 km || 
|-id=221 bgcolor=#fefefe
| 548221 ||  || — || April 9, 2003 || Palomar || NEAT ||  || align=right data-sort-value="0.81" | 810 m || 
|-id=222 bgcolor=#fefefe
| 548222 ||  || — || March 14, 2010 || Mount Lemmon || Mount Lemmon Survey ||  || align=right data-sort-value="0.62" | 620 m || 
|-id=223 bgcolor=#fefefe
| 548223 ||  || — || April 28, 2003 || Kitt Peak || Spacewatch ||  || align=right data-sort-value="0.94" | 940 m || 
|-id=224 bgcolor=#d6d6d6
| 548224 ||  || — || March 14, 2010 || Mount Lemmon || Mount Lemmon Survey ||  || align=right | 2.9 km || 
|-id=225 bgcolor=#fefefe
| 548225 ||  || — || October 9, 2008 || Goodricke-Pigott || R. A. Tucker || V || align=right data-sort-value="0.78" | 780 m || 
|-id=226 bgcolor=#fefefe
| 548226 ||  || — || July 18, 2007 || Mount Lemmon || Mount Lemmon Survey ||  || align=right data-sort-value="0.74" | 740 m || 
|-id=227 bgcolor=#fefefe
| 548227 ||  || — || March 12, 2010 || Mount Lemmon || Mount Lemmon Survey ||  || align=right data-sort-value="0.82" | 820 m || 
|-id=228 bgcolor=#d6d6d6
| 548228 ||  || — || March 12, 2010 || Kitt Peak || Spacewatch ||  || align=right | 3.4 km || 
|-id=229 bgcolor=#fefefe
| 548229 ||  || — || March 12, 2010 || Kitt Peak || Spacewatch ||  || align=right data-sort-value="0.78" | 780 m || 
|-id=230 bgcolor=#d6d6d6
| 548230 ||  || — || May 13, 2005 || Mount Lemmon || Mount Lemmon Survey ||  || align=right | 2.2 km || 
|-id=231 bgcolor=#d6d6d6
| 548231 ||  || — || January 8, 2010 || Kitt Peak || Spacewatch ||  || align=right | 3.2 km || 
|-id=232 bgcolor=#fefefe
| 548232 ||  || — || September 14, 2007 || Mount Lemmon || Mount Lemmon Survey ||  || align=right data-sort-value="0.75" | 750 m || 
|-id=233 bgcolor=#d6d6d6
| 548233 ||  || — || March 12, 2010 || Mount Lemmon || Mount Lemmon Survey ||  || align=right | 2.7 km || 
|-id=234 bgcolor=#d6d6d6
| 548234 ||  || — || March 13, 2010 || Kitt Peak || Spacewatch ||  || align=right | 3.5 km || 
|-id=235 bgcolor=#d6d6d6
| 548235 ||  || — || November 22, 2006 || Kitt Peak || Spacewatch || 3:2 || align=right | 4.6 km || 
|-id=236 bgcolor=#d6d6d6
| 548236 ||  || — || March 15, 2010 || Kitt Peak || Spacewatch ||  || align=right | 3.6 km || 
|-id=237 bgcolor=#fefefe
| 548237 ||  || — || March 12, 2010 || Kitt Peak || Spacewatch || H || align=right data-sort-value="0.62" | 620 m || 
|-id=238 bgcolor=#d6d6d6
| 548238 ||  || — || September 24, 2008 || Mount Lemmon || Mount Lemmon Survey ||  || align=right | 3.6 km || 
|-id=239 bgcolor=#fefefe
| 548239 ||  || — || March 12, 2010 || Kitt Peak || Spacewatch || NYS || align=right data-sort-value="0.63" | 630 m || 
|-id=240 bgcolor=#fefefe
| 548240 ||  || — || March 12, 2010 || Kitt Peak || Spacewatch || H || align=right data-sort-value="0.68" | 680 m || 
|-id=241 bgcolor=#fefefe
| 548241 ||  || — || March 13, 2010 || Kitt Peak || Spacewatch ||  || align=right data-sort-value="0.86" | 860 m || 
|-id=242 bgcolor=#E9E9E9
| 548242 ||  || — || March 13, 2010 || Kitt Peak || Spacewatch ||  || align=right | 1.5 km || 
|-id=243 bgcolor=#fefefe
| 548243 ||  || — || April 26, 2003 || Kitt Peak || Spacewatch ||  || align=right data-sort-value="0.71" | 710 m || 
|-id=244 bgcolor=#d6d6d6
| 548244 ||  || — || February 14, 2010 || Kitt Peak || Spacewatch ||  || align=right | 3.1 km || 
|-id=245 bgcolor=#fefefe
| 548245 ||  || — || May 26, 2003 || Kitt Peak || Spacewatch ||  || align=right data-sort-value="0.82" | 820 m || 
|-id=246 bgcolor=#fefefe
| 548246 ||  || — || January 22, 2006 || Mount Lemmon || Mount Lemmon Survey ||  || align=right data-sort-value="0.78" | 780 m || 
|-id=247 bgcolor=#d6d6d6
| 548247 ||  || — || March 15, 2010 || Kitt Peak || Spacewatch ||  || align=right | 2.8 km || 
|-id=248 bgcolor=#fefefe
| 548248 ||  || — || May 1, 2003 || Kitt Peak || Spacewatch ||  || align=right data-sort-value="0.71" | 710 m || 
|-id=249 bgcolor=#d6d6d6
| 548249 ||  || — || February 18, 2010 || Mount Lemmon || Mount Lemmon Survey ||  || align=right | 2.3 km || 
|-id=250 bgcolor=#d6d6d6
| 548250 ||  || — || March 13, 2010 || Catalina || CSS ||  || align=right | 2.3 km || 
|-id=251 bgcolor=#fefefe
| 548251 ||  || — || March 12, 2010 || Kitt Peak || Spacewatch ||  || align=right data-sort-value="0.68" | 680 m || 
|-id=252 bgcolor=#d6d6d6
| 548252 ||  || — || March 12, 2010 || Mount Lemmon || Mount Lemmon Survey ||  || align=right | 2.2 km || 
|-id=253 bgcolor=#d6d6d6
| 548253 ||  || — || October 8, 2008 || Mount Lemmon || Mount Lemmon Survey ||  || align=right | 3.4 km || 
|-id=254 bgcolor=#fefefe
| 548254 ||  || — || March 15, 2010 || Mount Lemmon || Mount Lemmon Survey ||  || align=right data-sort-value="0.75" | 750 m || 
|-id=255 bgcolor=#d6d6d6
| 548255 ||  || — || March 13, 2010 || Mount Lemmon || Mount Lemmon Survey ||  || align=right | 2.4 km || 
|-id=256 bgcolor=#d6d6d6
| 548256 ||  || — || March 12, 2010 || Kitt Peak || Spacewatch ||  || align=right | 2.3 km || 
|-id=257 bgcolor=#d6d6d6
| 548257 ||  || — || March 12, 2010 || Catalina || CSS ||  || align=right | 2.4 km || 
|-id=258 bgcolor=#E9E9E9
| 548258 ||  || — || March 12, 2010 || Kitt Peak || Spacewatch ||  || align=right | 1.2 km || 
|-id=259 bgcolor=#d6d6d6
| 548259 ||  || — || March 12, 2010 || Kitt Peak || Spacewatch ||  || align=right | 2.9 km || 
|-id=260 bgcolor=#d6d6d6
| 548260 ||  || — || December 28, 2008 || Piszkesteto || K. Sárneczky ||  || align=right | 2.5 km || 
|-id=261 bgcolor=#d6d6d6
| 548261 ||  || — || February 17, 2010 || Kitt Peak || Spacewatch ||  || align=right | 2.5 km || 
|-id=262 bgcolor=#d6d6d6
| 548262 ||  || — || September 14, 2007 || Mount Lemmon || Mount Lemmon Survey ||  || align=right | 2.8 km || 
|-id=263 bgcolor=#d6d6d6
| 548263 Alexandertutov ||  ||  || March 19, 2010 || Zelenchukskaya Stn || T. V. Kryachko, B. Satovski ||  || align=right | 2.5 km || 
|-id=264 bgcolor=#d6d6d6
| 548264 ||  || — || March 16, 2010 || Kitt Peak || Spacewatch ||  || align=right | 3.2 km || 
|-id=265 bgcolor=#fefefe
| 548265 ||  || — || November 7, 2005 || Mauna Kea || Mauna Kea Obs. ||  || align=right data-sort-value="0.74" | 740 m || 
|-id=266 bgcolor=#fefefe
| 548266 ||  || — || March 16, 2010 || Kitt Peak || Spacewatch ||  || align=right data-sort-value="0.78" | 780 m || 
|-id=267 bgcolor=#d6d6d6
| 548267 ||  || — || March 17, 2010 || Kitt Peak || Spacewatch ||  || align=right | 3.2 km || 
|-id=268 bgcolor=#fefefe
| 548268 ||  || — || March 17, 2010 || Kitt Peak || Spacewatch ||  || align=right data-sort-value="0.79" | 790 m || 
|-id=269 bgcolor=#d6d6d6
| 548269 ||  || — || February 16, 2010 || Mount Lemmon || Mount Lemmon Survey ||  || align=right | 3.2 km || 
|-id=270 bgcolor=#d6d6d6
| 548270 ||  || — || April 1, 2005 || Kitt Peak || Spacewatch ||  || align=right | 2.5 km || 
|-id=271 bgcolor=#d6d6d6
| 548271 ||  || — || October 14, 2001 || Apache Point || SDSS Collaboration ||  || align=right | 2.5 km || 
|-id=272 bgcolor=#d6d6d6
| 548272 ||  || — || November 17, 2008 || Kitt Peak || Spacewatch ||  || align=right | 2.3 km || 
|-id=273 bgcolor=#d6d6d6
| 548273 ||  || — || February 18, 2010 || Kitt Peak || Spacewatch ||  || align=right | 3.1 km || 
|-id=274 bgcolor=#d6d6d6
| 548274 ||  || — || March 18, 2010 || Mount Lemmon || Mount Lemmon Survey ||  || align=right | 2.4 km || 
|-id=275 bgcolor=#d6d6d6
| 548275 ||  || — || March 18, 2010 || Mount Lemmon || Mount Lemmon Survey ||  || align=right | 2.4 km || 
|-id=276 bgcolor=#E9E9E9
| 548276 ||  || — || September 23, 2008 || Mount Lemmon || Mount Lemmon Survey ||  || align=right data-sort-value="0.83" | 830 m || 
|-id=277 bgcolor=#d6d6d6
| 548277 ||  || — || February 13, 2010 || Mount Lemmon || Mount Lemmon Survey ||  || align=right | 3.7 km || 
|-id=278 bgcolor=#d6d6d6
| 548278 ||  || — || August 28, 2001 || Kitt Peak || Spacewatch ||  || align=right | 2.7 km || 
|-id=279 bgcolor=#d6d6d6
| 548279 ||  || — || March 19, 2010 || Mount Lemmon || Mount Lemmon Survey ||  || align=right | 2.9 km || 
|-id=280 bgcolor=#fefefe
| 548280 ||  || — || January 30, 2006 || Kitt Peak || Spacewatch ||  || align=right data-sort-value="0.86" | 860 m || 
|-id=281 bgcolor=#d6d6d6
| 548281 ||  || — || March 20, 2010 || Mount Lemmon || Mount Lemmon Survey ||  || align=right | 3.1 km || 
|-id=282 bgcolor=#fefefe
| 548282 ||  || — || March 20, 2010 || Mount Lemmon || Mount Lemmon Survey ||  || align=right data-sort-value="0.69" | 690 m || 
|-id=283 bgcolor=#d6d6d6
| 548283 ||  || — || March 17, 2004 || Kitt Peak || Spacewatch ||  || align=right | 2.5 km || 
|-id=284 bgcolor=#fefefe
| 548284 ||  || — || March 17, 2010 || Kitt Peak || Spacewatch ||  || align=right data-sort-value="0.75" | 750 m || 
|-id=285 bgcolor=#fefefe
| 548285 ||  || — || March 19, 2010 || Kitt Peak || Spacewatch ||  || align=right data-sort-value="0.82" | 820 m || 
|-id=286 bgcolor=#d6d6d6
| 548286 ||  || — || March 19, 2010 || Mount Lemmon || Mount Lemmon Survey ||  || align=right | 2.9 km || 
|-id=287 bgcolor=#d6d6d6
| 548287 ||  || — || April 7, 2005 || Kitt Peak || Spacewatch ||  || align=right | 3.1 km || 
|-id=288 bgcolor=#fefefe
| 548288 ||  || — || March 19, 2010 || Kitt Peak || Spacewatch ||  || align=right data-sort-value="0.78" | 780 m || 
|-id=289 bgcolor=#d6d6d6
| 548289 ||  || — || March 19, 2010 || Kitt Peak || Spacewatch ||  || align=right | 2.1 km || 
|-id=290 bgcolor=#d6d6d6
| 548290 ||  || — || September 12, 2007 || Mount Lemmon || Mount Lemmon Survey ||  || align=right | 2.8 km || 
|-id=291 bgcolor=#fefefe
| 548291 ||  || — || March 17, 2010 || Kitt Peak || Spacewatch ||  || align=right data-sort-value="0.75" | 750 m || 
|-id=292 bgcolor=#fefefe
| 548292 ||  || — || November 7, 2005 || Mauna Kea || Mauna Kea Obs. ||  || align=right data-sort-value="0.75" | 750 m || 
|-id=293 bgcolor=#d6d6d6
| 548293 ||  || — || June 7, 2000 || Kitt Peak || Spacewatch ||  || align=right | 3.4 km || 
|-id=294 bgcolor=#fefefe
| 548294 ||  || — || September 11, 2004 || Kitt Peak || Spacewatch ||  || align=right data-sort-value="0.78" | 780 m || 
|-id=295 bgcolor=#fefefe
| 548295 ||  || — || October 8, 2008 || Kitt Peak || Spacewatch ||  || align=right data-sort-value="0.75" | 750 m || 
|-id=296 bgcolor=#fefefe
| 548296 ||  || — || February 1, 2006 || Mount Lemmon || Mount Lemmon Survey ||  || align=right data-sort-value="0.71" | 710 m || 
|-id=297 bgcolor=#d6d6d6
| 548297 ||  || — || March 14, 2010 || Kitt Peak || Spacewatch ||  || align=right | 2.8 km || 
|-id=298 bgcolor=#d6d6d6
| 548298 ||  || — || March 18, 2010 || Palomar || PTF ||  || align=right | 3.5 km || 
|-id=299 bgcolor=#d6d6d6
| 548299 ||  || — || March 15, 2004 || Kitt Peak || Spacewatch ||  || align=right | 2.5 km || 
|-id=300 bgcolor=#d6d6d6
| 548300 ||  || — || March 18, 2010 || Mount Lemmon || Mount Lemmon Survey ||  || align=right | 2.7 km || 
|}

548301–548400 

|-bgcolor=#d6d6d6
| 548301 ||  || — || March 19, 2010 || Mount Lemmon || Mount Lemmon Survey ||  || align=right | 3.4 km || 
|-id=302 bgcolor=#d6d6d6
| 548302 ||  || — || January 22, 2015 || Haleakala || Pan-STARRS ||  || align=right | 2.4 km || 
|-id=303 bgcolor=#d6d6d6
| 548303 ||  || — || March 18, 2010 || Mount Lemmon || Mount Lemmon Survey ||  || align=right | 2.4 km || 
|-id=304 bgcolor=#d6d6d6
| 548304 ||  || — || October 23, 2013 || Haleakala || Pan-STARRS ||  || align=right | 2.9 km || 
|-id=305 bgcolor=#d6d6d6
| 548305 ||  || — || January 23, 2015 || Haleakala || Pan-STARRS ||  || align=right | 2.7 km || 
|-id=306 bgcolor=#fefefe
| 548306 ||  || — || May 4, 2014 || Mount Lemmon || Mount Lemmon Survey ||  || align=right data-sort-value="0.78" | 780 m || 
|-id=307 bgcolor=#E9E9E9
| 548307 ||  || — || February 24, 2014 || Haleakala || Pan-STARRS ||  || align=right | 1.4 km || 
|-id=308 bgcolor=#E9E9E9
| 548308 ||  || — || October 8, 2012 || Mount Lemmon || Mount Lemmon Survey ||  || align=right | 1.3 km || 
|-id=309 bgcolor=#d6d6d6
| 548309 ||  || — || January 18, 2016 || Haleakala || Pan-STARRS ||  || align=right | 2.7 km || 
|-id=310 bgcolor=#d6d6d6
| 548310 ||  || — || March 25, 2010 || Mount Lemmon || Mount Lemmon Survey ||  || align=right | 2.9 km || 
|-id=311 bgcolor=#fefefe
| 548311 ||  || — || March 18, 2010 || Kitt Peak || Spacewatch ||  || align=right data-sort-value="0.82" | 820 m || 
|-id=312 bgcolor=#fefefe
| 548312 ||  || — || March 18, 2010 || Mount Lemmon || Mount Lemmon Survey ||  || align=right data-sort-value="0.75" | 750 m || 
|-id=313 bgcolor=#fefefe
| 548313 ||  || — || March 21, 2010 || Mount Lemmon || Mount Lemmon Survey ||  || align=right data-sort-value="0.68" | 680 m || 
|-id=314 bgcolor=#E9E9E9
| 548314 ||  || — || March 19, 2010 || Mount Lemmon || Mount Lemmon Survey ||  || align=right | 1.4 km || 
|-id=315 bgcolor=#FA8072
| 548315 ||  || — || August 20, 2006 || Palomar || NEAT ||  || align=right data-sort-value="0.59" | 590 m || 
|-id=316 bgcolor=#fefefe
| 548316 ||  || — || April 5, 2010 || Kitt Peak || Spacewatch ||  || align=right data-sort-value="0.71" | 710 m || 
|-id=317 bgcolor=#fefefe
| 548317 ||  || — || April 7, 2010 || La Sagra || OAM Obs. ||  || align=right data-sort-value="0.98" | 980 m || 
|-id=318 bgcolor=#fefefe
| 548318 ||  || — || March 4, 2006 || Kitt Peak || Spacewatch || NYS || align=right data-sort-value="0.60" | 600 m || 
|-id=319 bgcolor=#E9E9E9
| 548319 ||  || — || September 12, 2007 || Kitt Peak || Spacewatch ||  || align=right | 1.0 km || 
|-id=320 bgcolor=#E9E9E9
| 548320 ||  || — || September 26, 1995 || Kitt Peak || Spacewatch ||  || align=right | 1.2 km || 
|-id=321 bgcolor=#fefefe
| 548321 ||  || — || March 14, 2010 || Kitt Peak || Spacewatch ||  || align=right data-sort-value="0.90" | 900 m || 
|-id=322 bgcolor=#d6d6d6
| 548322 ||  || — || April 12, 2010 || Mount Lemmon || Mount Lemmon Survey ||  || align=right | 2.5 km || 
|-id=323 bgcolor=#fefefe
| 548323 ||  || — || April 12, 2010 || Mount Lemmon || Mount Lemmon Survey ||  || align=right data-sort-value="0.70" | 700 m || 
|-id=324 bgcolor=#d6d6d6
| 548324 ||  || — || October 18, 2007 || Kitt Peak || Spacewatch ||  || align=right | 2.6 km || 
|-id=325 bgcolor=#d6d6d6
| 548325 ||  || — || September 17, 2006 || Kitt Peak || Spacewatch ||  || align=right | 2.7 km || 
|-id=326 bgcolor=#fefefe
| 548326 ||  || — || November 18, 2008 || Kitt Peak || Spacewatch ||  || align=right data-sort-value="0.90" | 900 m || 
|-id=327 bgcolor=#d6d6d6
| 548327 ||  || — || April 6, 2010 || Mount Lemmon || Mount Lemmon Survey ||  || align=right | 2.3 km || 
|-id=328 bgcolor=#d6d6d6
| 548328 ||  || — || November 18, 2007 || Mount Lemmon || Mount Lemmon Survey ||  || align=right | 2.4 km || 
|-id=329 bgcolor=#E9E9E9
| 548329 ||  || — || October 6, 2007 || Bergisch Gladbach || W. Bickel ||  || align=right | 2.4 km || 
|-id=330 bgcolor=#fefefe
| 548330 ||  || — || October 19, 2000 || Kitt Peak || Spacewatch ||  || align=right | 1.3 km || 
|-id=331 bgcolor=#d6d6d6
| 548331 ||  || — || May 20, 2005 || Mount Lemmon || Mount Lemmon Survey ||  || align=right | 3.4 km || 
|-id=332 bgcolor=#d6d6d6
| 548332 ||  || — || April 10, 2010 || Kitt Peak || Spacewatch ||  || align=right | 3.7 km || 
|-id=333 bgcolor=#d6d6d6
| 548333 ||  || — || October 20, 2007 || Mount Lemmon || Mount Lemmon Survey ||  || align=right | 3.2 km || 
|-id=334 bgcolor=#fefefe
| 548334 ||  || — || November 7, 2005 || Mauna Kea || Mauna Kea Obs. ||  || align=right data-sort-value="0.78" | 780 m || 
|-id=335 bgcolor=#d6d6d6
| 548335 ||  || — || November 4, 2007 || Mount Lemmon || Mount Lemmon Survey ||  || align=right | 2.5 km || 
|-id=336 bgcolor=#d6d6d6
| 548336 ||  || — || April 11, 2010 || Kitt Peak || Spacewatch ||  || align=right | 3.1 km || 
|-id=337 bgcolor=#fefefe
| 548337 ||  || — || December 2, 2005 || Mauna Kea || Mauna Kea Obs. ||  || align=right data-sort-value="0.82" | 820 m || 
|-id=338 bgcolor=#d6d6d6
| 548338 ||  || — || April 10, 2010 || Kitt Peak || Spacewatch ||  || align=right | 2.8 km || 
|-id=339 bgcolor=#d6d6d6
| 548339 ||  || — || April 10, 2010 || Kitt Peak || Spacewatch ||  || align=right | 3.1 km || 
|-id=340 bgcolor=#d6d6d6
| 548340 ||  || — || March 26, 2004 || Kitt Peak || Spacewatch ||  || align=right | 2.8 km || 
|-id=341 bgcolor=#d6d6d6
| 548341 ||  || — || April 4, 2010 || Kitt Peak || Spacewatch ||  || align=right | 3.2 km || 
|-id=342 bgcolor=#d6d6d6
| 548342 ||  || — || April 4, 2010 || Kitt Peak || Spacewatch ||  || align=right | 2.3 km || 
|-id=343 bgcolor=#E9E9E9
| 548343 ||  || — || April 5, 2010 || Kitt Peak || Spacewatch ||  || align=right | 1.1 km || 
|-id=344 bgcolor=#d6d6d6
| 548344 ||  || — || March 12, 2010 || Kitt Peak || Spacewatch ||  || align=right | 2.3 km || 
|-id=345 bgcolor=#d6d6d6
| 548345 ||  || — || April 10, 2010 || Mount Lemmon || Mount Lemmon Survey ||  || align=right | 3.1 km || 
|-id=346 bgcolor=#d6d6d6
| 548346 ||  || — || April 11, 2010 || Mount Lemmon || Mount Lemmon Survey ||  || align=right | 2.7 km || 
|-id=347 bgcolor=#d6d6d6
| 548347 ||  || — || October 2, 2006 || Catalina || CSS ||  || align=right | 3.2 km || 
|-id=348 bgcolor=#d6d6d6
| 548348 ||  || — || September 16, 2006 || Catalina || CSS ||  || align=right | 3.2 km || 
|-id=349 bgcolor=#fefefe
| 548349 ||  || — || March 20, 2010 || Mount Lemmon || Mount Lemmon Survey ||  || align=right data-sort-value="0.75" | 750 m || 
|-id=350 bgcolor=#fefefe
| 548350 ||  || — || April 9, 2010 || Mount Lemmon || Mount Lemmon Survey ||  || align=right | 1.1 km || 
|-id=351 bgcolor=#d6d6d6
| 548351 ||  || — || November 2, 2008 || Mount Lemmon || Mount Lemmon Survey ||  || align=right | 2.2 km || 
|-id=352 bgcolor=#d6d6d6
| 548352 ||  || — || August 28, 2001 || Kitt Peak || Spacewatch ||  || align=right | 2.5 km || 
|-id=353 bgcolor=#fefefe
| 548353 ||  || — || July 18, 2007 || Mount Lemmon || Mount Lemmon Survey ||  || align=right data-sort-value="0.94" | 940 m || 
|-id=354 bgcolor=#d6d6d6
| 548354 ||  || — || April 12, 2010 || Mount Lemmon || Mount Lemmon Survey ||  || align=right | 2.9 km || 
|-id=355 bgcolor=#FA8072
| 548355 ||  || — || April 14, 2010 || Catalina || CSS ||  || align=right data-sort-value="0.95" | 950 m || 
|-id=356 bgcolor=#d6d6d6
| 548356 ||  || — || April 4, 2010 || Palomar || PTF ||  || align=right | 3.3 km || 
|-id=357 bgcolor=#d6d6d6
| 548357 ||  || — || May 8, 2005 || Catalina || CSS ||  || align=right | 4.2 km || 
|-id=358 bgcolor=#d6d6d6
| 548358 ||  || — || February 13, 2004 || Kitt Peak || Spacewatch || EOS || align=right | 2.7 km || 
|-id=359 bgcolor=#d6d6d6
| 548359 ||  || — || October 20, 2007 || Kitt Peak || Spacewatch ||  || align=right | 2.9 km || 
|-id=360 bgcolor=#d6d6d6
| 548360 ||  || — || April 6, 2005 || Mount Lemmon || Mount Lemmon Survey ||  || align=right | 2.8 km || 
|-id=361 bgcolor=#fefefe
| 548361 ||  || — || April 10, 2010 || Mount Lemmon || Mount Lemmon Survey ||  || align=right data-sort-value="0.59" | 590 m || 
|-id=362 bgcolor=#d6d6d6
| 548362 ||  || — || April 15, 2010 || Mount Lemmon || Mount Lemmon Survey ||  || align=right | 2.6 km || 
|-id=363 bgcolor=#fefefe
| 548363 ||  || — || February 2, 2006 || Kitt Peak || Spacewatch ||  || align=right data-sort-value="0.68" | 680 m || 
|-id=364 bgcolor=#d6d6d6
| 548364 ||  || — || April 3, 2016 || Haleakala || Pan-STARRS ||  || align=right | 2.7 km || 
|-id=365 bgcolor=#d6d6d6
| 548365 ||  || — || November 26, 2014 || Haleakala || Pan-STARRS ||  || align=right | 2.2 km || 
|-id=366 bgcolor=#d6d6d6
| 548366 ||  || — || January 22, 2015 || Haleakala || Pan-STARRS ||  || align=right | 2.8 km || 
|-id=367 bgcolor=#fefefe
| 548367 ||  || — || May 20, 2014 || Haleakala || Pan-STARRS ||  || align=right data-sort-value="0.86" | 860 m || 
|-id=368 bgcolor=#fefefe
| 548368 ||  || — || April 9, 2010 || Mount Lemmon || Mount Lemmon Survey ||  || align=right data-sort-value="0.72" | 720 m || 
|-id=369 bgcolor=#E9E9E9
| 548369 ||  || — || April 11, 2010 || Mount Lemmon || Mount Lemmon Survey ||  || align=right | 1.1 km || 
|-id=370 bgcolor=#E9E9E9
| 548370 ||  || — || April 9, 2010 || Kitt Peak || Spacewatch ||  || align=right | 1.5 km || 
|-id=371 bgcolor=#E9E9E9
| 548371 ||  || — || December 31, 2012 || Haleakala || Pan-STARRS ||  || align=right data-sort-value="0.98" | 980 m || 
|-id=372 bgcolor=#E9E9E9
| 548372 ||  || — || December 23, 2012 || Haleakala || Pan-STARRS ||  || align=right data-sort-value="0.98" | 980 m || 
|-id=373 bgcolor=#d6d6d6
| 548373 ||  || — || February 10, 2016 || Haleakala || Pan-STARRS ||  || align=right | 3.7 km || 
|-id=374 bgcolor=#fefefe
| 548374 ||  || — || April 4, 2010 || Kitt Peak || Spacewatch ||  || align=right data-sort-value="0.63" | 630 m || 
|-id=375 bgcolor=#d6d6d6
| 548375 ||  || — || October 26, 2013 || Kitt Peak || Spacewatch ||  || align=right | 2.8 km || 
|-id=376 bgcolor=#d6d6d6
| 548376 ||  || — || November 27, 2013 || Haleakala || Pan-STARRS ||  || align=right | 3.7 km || 
|-id=377 bgcolor=#d6d6d6
| 548377 ||  || — || February 16, 2015 || Haleakala || Pan-STARRS ||  || align=right | 2.5 km || 
|-id=378 bgcolor=#fefefe
| 548378 ||  || — || September 8, 2011 || Kitt Peak || Spacewatch ||  || align=right data-sort-value="0.68" | 680 m || 
|-id=379 bgcolor=#fefefe
| 548379 ||  || — || January 16, 2017 || Haleakala || Pan-STARRS ||  || align=right data-sort-value="0.90" | 900 m || 
|-id=380 bgcolor=#fefefe
| 548380 ||  || — || April 7, 2010 || Kitt Peak || Spacewatch ||  || align=right data-sort-value="0.90" | 900 m || 
|-id=381 bgcolor=#d6d6d6
| 548381 ||  || — || April 9, 2010 || Mount Lemmon || Mount Lemmon Survey ||  || align=right | 3.4 km || 
|-id=382 bgcolor=#d6d6d6
| 548382 ||  || — || April 12, 2010 || Mount Lemmon || Mount Lemmon Survey ||  || align=right | 2.3 km || 
|-id=383 bgcolor=#d6d6d6
| 548383 ||  || — || April 9, 2010 || Kitt Peak || Spacewatch ||  || align=right | 2.7 km || 
|-id=384 bgcolor=#d6d6d6
| 548384 ||  || — || April 10, 2010 || Mount Lemmon || Mount Lemmon Survey ||  || align=right | 2.1 km || 
|-id=385 bgcolor=#d6d6d6
| 548385 ||  || — || November 20, 2003 || Apache Point || SDSS Collaboration ||  || align=right | 2.3 km || 
|-id=386 bgcolor=#d6d6d6
| 548386 ||  || — || January 10, 2016 || Haleakala || Pan-STARRS ||  || align=right | 3.8 km || 
|-id=387 bgcolor=#E9E9E9
| 548387 ||  || — || April 17, 2010 || Mount Lemmon || Mount Lemmon Survey ||  || align=right data-sort-value="0.90" | 900 m || 
|-id=388 bgcolor=#fefefe
| 548388 ||  || — || September 26, 1995 || Kitt Peak || Spacewatch ||  || align=right data-sort-value="0.52" | 520 m || 
|-id=389 bgcolor=#fefefe
| 548389 ||  || — || October 28, 2008 || Mount Lemmon || Mount Lemmon Survey ||  || align=right data-sort-value="0.78" | 780 m || 
|-id=390 bgcolor=#fefefe
| 548390 ||  || — || February 27, 2006 || Kitt Peak || Spacewatch || MAS || align=right data-sort-value="0.68" | 680 m || 
|-id=391 bgcolor=#fefefe
| 548391 ||  || — || April 20, 2010 || Kitt Peak || Spacewatch ||  || align=right data-sort-value="0.81" | 810 m || 
|-id=392 bgcolor=#d6d6d6
| 548392 ||  || — || November 1, 2007 || Kitt Peak || Spacewatch ||  || align=right | 3.7 km || 
|-id=393 bgcolor=#d6d6d6
| 548393 ||  || — || January 26, 2015 || Haleakala || Pan-STARRS ||  || align=right | 2.7 km || 
|-id=394 bgcolor=#fefefe
| 548394 ||  || — || June 3, 2008 || Mount Lemmon || Mount Lemmon Survey ||  || align=right | 1.2 km || 
|-id=395 bgcolor=#d6d6d6
| 548395 ||  || — || February 1, 2005 || Kitt Peak || Spacewatch ||  || align=right | 2.7 km || 
|-id=396 bgcolor=#E9E9E9
| 548396 ||  || — || April 20, 2010 || Mount Lemmon || Mount Lemmon Survey ||  || align=right | 1.4 km || 
|-id=397 bgcolor=#fefefe
| 548397 ||  || — || July 18, 2007 || Mount Lemmon || Mount Lemmon Survey ||  || align=right data-sort-value="0.78" | 780 m || 
|-id=398 bgcolor=#d6d6d6
| 548398 ||  || — || April 10, 2010 || Mount Lemmon || Mount Lemmon Survey ||  || align=right | 2.5 km || 
|-id=399 bgcolor=#d6d6d6
| 548399 ||  || — || May 3, 2010 || Kitt Peak || Spacewatch ||  || align=right | 2.9 km || 
|-id=400 bgcolor=#fefefe
| 548400 ||  || — || May 4, 2010 || Charleston || R. Holmes ||  || align=right data-sort-value="0.91" | 910 m || 
|}

548401–548500 

|-bgcolor=#fefefe
| 548401 ||  || — || May 5, 2010 || Mount Lemmon || Mount Lemmon Survey ||  || align=right data-sort-value="0.71" | 710 m || 
|-id=402 bgcolor=#d6d6d6
| 548402 ||  || — || May 7, 2010 || Mount Lemmon || Mount Lemmon Survey ||  || align=right | 3.4 km || 
|-id=403 bgcolor=#E9E9E9
| 548403 ||  || — || May 6, 2010 || Mount Lemmon || Mount Lemmon Survey ||  || align=right | 1.8 km || 
|-id=404 bgcolor=#d6d6d6
| 548404 ||  || — || February 13, 2009 || Mount Lemmon || Mount Lemmon Survey ||  || align=right | 3.4 km || 
|-id=405 bgcolor=#fefefe
| 548405 ||  || — || March 3, 2006 || Kitt Peak || Spacewatch ||  || align=right data-sort-value="0.75" | 750 m || 
|-id=406 bgcolor=#d6d6d6
| 548406 ||  || — || April 10, 2010 || Mount Lemmon || Mount Lemmon Survey ||  || align=right | 3.2 km || 
|-id=407 bgcolor=#fefefe
| 548407 ||  || — || September 14, 2005 || Kitt Peak || Spacewatch || H || align=right data-sort-value="0.65" | 650 m || 
|-id=408 bgcolor=#d6d6d6
| 548408 ||  || — || May 6, 2010 || Mount Lemmon || Mount Lemmon Survey ||  || align=right | 2.3 km || 
|-id=409 bgcolor=#d6d6d6
| 548409 ||  || — || April 14, 2004 || Catalina || CSS ||  || align=right | 3.7 km || 
|-id=410 bgcolor=#d6d6d6
| 548410 ||  || — || May 9, 2010 || Mount Lemmon || Mount Lemmon Survey ||  || align=right | 2.8 km || 
|-id=411 bgcolor=#fefefe
| 548411 ||  || — || May 10, 2010 || Mount Lemmon || Mount Lemmon Survey ||  || align=right data-sort-value="0.57" | 570 m || 
|-id=412 bgcolor=#fefefe
| 548412 ||  || — || October 9, 2007 || Mount Lemmon || Mount Lemmon Survey ||  || align=right data-sort-value="0.86" | 860 m || 
|-id=413 bgcolor=#E9E9E9
| 548413 ||  || — || June 21, 2001 || Palomar || NEAT ||  || align=right | 2.3 km || 
|-id=414 bgcolor=#fefefe
| 548414 ||  || — || March 26, 2003 || Palomar || NEAT ||  || align=right data-sort-value="0.78" | 780 m || 
|-id=415 bgcolor=#d6d6d6
| 548415 ||  || — || February 2, 2009 || Kitt Peak || Spacewatch ||  || align=right | 2.4 km || 
|-id=416 bgcolor=#E9E9E9
| 548416 ||  || — || May 11, 2010 || Mount Lemmon || Mount Lemmon Survey ||  || align=right | 2.8 km || 
|-id=417 bgcolor=#d6d6d6
| 548417 ||  || — || January 20, 2009 || Kitt Peak || Spacewatch ||  || align=right | 2.5 km || 
|-id=418 bgcolor=#fefefe
| 548418 ||  || — || March 22, 2002 || Kitt Peak || Spacewatch ||  || align=right data-sort-value="0.78" | 780 m || 
|-id=419 bgcolor=#fefefe
| 548419 ||  || — || May 3, 2010 || Kitt Peak || Spacewatch ||  || align=right data-sort-value="0.90" | 900 m || 
|-id=420 bgcolor=#E9E9E9
| 548420 ||  || — || January 16, 2009 || Mount Lemmon || Mount Lemmon Survey ||  || align=right | 2.3 km || 
|-id=421 bgcolor=#fefefe
| 548421 ||  || — || May 12, 2010 || Kitt Peak || Spacewatch ||  || align=right data-sort-value="0.82" | 820 m || 
|-id=422 bgcolor=#d6d6d6
| 548422 ||  || — || May 11, 2010 || Mount Lemmon || Mount Lemmon Survey ||  || align=right | 2.4 km || 
|-id=423 bgcolor=#d6d6d6
| 548423 ||  || — || October 2, 2006 || Mount Lemmon || Mount Lemmon Survey || 7:4 || align=right | 3.9 km || 
|-id=424 bgcolor=#d6d6d6
| 548424 ||  || — || September 15, 2007 || Mount Lemmon || Mount Lemmon Survey ||  || align=right | 3.1 km || 
|-id=425 bgcolor=#E9E9E9
| 548425 ||  || — || August 12, 2006 || Palomar || NEAT ||  || align=right | 1.9 km || 
|-id=426 bgcolor=#d6d6d6
| 548426 ||  || — || May 12, 2010 || Kitt Peak || Spacewatch ||  || align=right | 2.7 km || 
|-id=427 bgcolor=#d6d6d6
| 548427 ||  || — || May 12, 2010 || Mount Lemmon || Mount Lemmon Survey ||  || align=right | 3.0 km || 
|-id=428 bgcolor=#d6d6d6
| 548428 ||  || — || March 30, 2004 || Kitt Peak || Spacewatch ||  || align=right | 3.8 km || 
|-id=429 bgcolor=#fefefe
| 548429 ||  || — || May 6, 2010 || Mount Lemmon || Mount Lemmon Survey ||  || align=right data-sort-value="0.98" | 980 m || 
|-id=430 bgcolor=#d6d6d6
| 548430 ||  || — || March 9, 2004 || Palomar || NEAT || TIR || align=right | 3.4 km || 
|-id=431 bgcolor=#fefefe
| 548431 ||  || — || February 25, 2006 || Kitt Peak || Spacewatch ||  || align=right data-sort-value="0.90" | 900 m || 
|-id=432 bgcolor=#fefefe
| 548432 ||  || — || September 19, 2003 || Campo Imperatore || A. Boattini, A. Di Paola || NYS || align=right data-sort-value="0.76" | 760 m || 
|-id=433 bgcolor=#d6d6d6
| 548433 ||  || — || April 8, 2010 || Mount Lemmon || Mount Lemmon Survey ||  || align=right | 2.9 km || 
|-id=434 bgcolor=#d6d6d6
| 548434 ||  || — || November 3, 2007 || Kitt Peak || Spacewatch ||  || align=right | 3.3 km || 
|-id=435 bgcolor=#d6d6d6
| 548435 ||  || — || May 13, 2010 || Kitt Peak || Spacewatch ||  || align=right | 2.5 km || 
|-id=436 bgcolor=#E9E9E9
| 548436 ||  || — || May 4, 2010 || Kitt Peak || Spacewatch ||  || align=right | 2.5 km || 
|-id=437 bgcolor=#fefefe
| 548437 ||  || — || April 9, 2010 || Mount Lemmon || Mount Lemmon Survey ||  || align=right data-sort-value="0.71" | 710 m || 
|-id=438 bgcolor=#fefefe
| 548438 ||  || — || December 23, 2012 || Haleakala || Pan-STARRS ||  || align=right data-sort-value="0.75" | 750 m || 
|-id=439 bgcolor=#fefefe
| 548439 ||  || — || October 9, 2004 || Kitt Peak || Spacewatch ||  || align=right data-sort-value="0.94" | 940 m || 
|-id=440 bgcolor=#E9E9E9
| 548440 ||  || — || October 10, 2007 || Kitt Peak || Spacewatch ||  || align=right | 1.2 km || 
|-id=441 bgcolor=#d6d6d6
| 548441 ||  || — || March 14, 2010 || Kitt Peak || Spacewatch ||  || align=right | 3.5 km || 
|-id=442 bgcolor=#d6d6d6
| 548442 ||  || — || October 11, 2007 || Kitt Peak || Spacewatch ||  || align=right | 3.4 km || 
|-id=443 bgcolor=#fefefe
| 548443 ||  || — || January 10, 2013 || Haleakala || Pan-STARRS ||  || align=right data-sort-value="0.78" | 780 m || 
|-id=444 bgcolor=#fefefe
| 548444 ||  || — || September 10, 2007 || Kitt Peak || Spacewatch ||  || align=right data-sort-value="0.78" | 780 m || 
|-id=445 bgcolor=#d6d6d6
| 548445 ||  || — || March 21, 2004 || Kitt Peak || Spacewatch ||  || align=right | 3.2 km || 
|-id=446 bgcolor=#d6d6d6
| 548446 ||  || — || December 5, 2008 || Kitt Peak || Spacewatch ||  || align=right | 2.2 km || 
|-id=447 bgcolor=#fefefe
| 548447 ||  || — || April 11, 2010 || Mount Lemmon || Mount Lemmon Survey ||  || align=right data-sort-value="0.98" | 980 m || 
|-id=448 bgcolor=#E9E9E9
| 548448 ||  || — || May 13, 2010 || Kitt Peak || Spacewatch ||  || align=right | 2.3 km || 
|-id=449 bgcolor=#d6d6d6
| 548449 ||  || — || February 11, 2004 || Palomar || NEAT || EOS || align=right | 2.5 km || 
|-id=450 bgcolor=#E9E9E9
| 548450 ||  || — || December 4, 2008 || Kitt Peak || Spacewatch ||  || align=right | 2.4 km || 
|-id=451 bgcolor=#fefefe
| 548451 ||  || — || October 6, 2008 || Mount Lemmon || Mount Lemmon Survey ||  || align=right data-sort-value="0.98" | 980 m || 
|-id=452 bgcolor=#d6d6d6
| 548452 ||  || — || September 5, 2008 || Kitt Peak || Spacewatch ||  || align=right | 2.2 km || 
|-id=453 bgcolor=#d6d6d6
| 548453 ||  || — || September 23, 2008 || Kitt Peak || Spacewatch ||  || align=right | 2.5 km || 
|-id=454 bgcolor=#d6d6d6
| 548454 ||  || — || January 16, 2015 || Haleakala || Pan-STARRS ||  || align=right | 2.7 km || 
|-id=455 bgcolor=#d6d6d6
| 548455 ||  || — || July 28, 2015 || Haleakala || Pan-STARRS ||  || align=right | 2.0 km || 
|-id=456 bgcolor=#fefefe
| 548456 ||  || — || May 11, 2010 || Mount Lemmon || Mount Lemmon Survey ||  || align=right data-sort-value="0.76" | 760 m || 
|-id=457 bgcolor=#fefefe
| 548457 ||  || — || October 18, 2011 || Mount Lemmon || Mount Lemmon Survey ||  || align=right data-sort-value="0.49" | 490 m || 
|-id=458 bgcolor=#fefefe
| 548458 ||  || — || September 29, 2011 || Mount Lemmon || Mount Lemmon Survey || H || align=right data-sort-value="0.53" | 530 m || 
|-id=459 bgcolor=#d6d6d6
| 548459 ||  || — || October 12, 2013 || Kitt Peak || Spacewatch ||  || align=right | 2.7 km || 
|-id=460 bgcolor=#E9E9E9
| 548460 ||  || — || January 11, 2018 || Haleakala || Pan-STARRS ||  || align=right | 1.3 km || 
|-id=461 bgcolor=#fefefe
| 548461 ||  || — || December 9, 2015 || Haleakala || Pan-STARRS ||  || align=right data-sort-value="0.71" | 710 m || 
|-id=462 bgcolor=#E9E9E9
| 548462 ||  || — || January 16, 2018 || Haleakala || Pan-STARRS ||  || align=right | 1.2 km || 
|-id=463 bgcolor=#E9E9E9
| 548463 ||  || — || August 26, 2011 || Kitt Peak || Spacewatch ||  || align=right | 1.9 km || 
|-id=464 bgcolor=#fefefe
| 548464 ||  || — || May 11, 2010 || Mount Lemmon || Mount Lemmon Survey ||  || align=right data-sort-value="0.75" | 750 m || 
|-id=465 bgcolor=#d6d6d6
| 548465 ||  || — || May 4, 2010 || Kitt Peak || Spacewatch ||  || align=right | 2.9 km || 
|-id=466 bgcolor=#d6d6d6
| 548466 ||  || — || May 8, 2010 || Mount Lemmon || Mount Lemmon Survey ||  || align=right | 2.3 km || 
|-id=467 bgcolor=#E9E9E9
| 548467 ||  || — || April 9, 2010 || Mount Lemmon || Mount Lemmon Survey ||  || align=right | 2.1 km || 
|-id=468 bgcolor=#E9E9E9
| 548468 ||  || — || May 4, 2010 || Kitt Peak || Spacewatch ||  || align=right | 2.0 km || 
|-id=469 bgcolor=#E9E9E9
| 548469 ||  || — || October 16, 2007 || Kitt Peak || Spacewatch ||  || align=right | 2.4 km || 
|-id=470 bgcolor=#E9E9E9
| 548470 ||  || — || November 13, 2007 || Mount Lemmon || Mount Lemmon Survey ||  || align=right | 1.0 km || 
|-id=471 bgcolor=#E9E9E9
| 548471 ||  || — || May 20, 2010 || Mount Lemmon || Mount Lemmon Survey ||  || align=right | 2.0 km || 
|-id=472 bgcolor=#d6d6d6
| 548472 ||  || — || April 1, 2016 || Haleakala || Pan-STARRS ||  || align=right | 2.2 km || 
|-id=473 bgcolor=#d6d6d6
| 548473 ||  || — || October 3, 2013 || Kitt Peak || Spacewatch ||  || align=right | 3.2 km || 
|-id=474 bgcolor=#d6d6d6
| 548474 ||  || — || January 28, 2015 || Haleakala || Pan-STARRS ||  || align=right | 2.7 km || 
|-id=475 bgcolor=#d6d6d6
| 548475 ||  || — || June 8, 2010 || Kachina || J. Hobart ||  || align=right | 3.7 km || 
|-id=476 bgcolor=#fefefe
| 548476 ||  || — || July 5, 2002 || Kitt Peak || Spacewatch || H || align=right data-sort-value="0.71" | 710 m || 
|-id=477 bgcolor=#E9E9E9
| 548477 ||  || — || October 8, 2007 || Mount Lemmon || Mount Lemmon Survey ||  || align=right | 2.1 km || 
|-id=478 bgcolor=#fefefe
| 548478 ||  || — || April 2, 2006 || Kitt Peak || Spacewatch ||  || align=right data-sort-value="0.73" | 730 m || 
|-id=479 bgcolor=#E9E9E9
| 548479 ||  || — || December 15, 2007 || Kitt Peak || Spacewatch ||  || align=right | 1.1 km || 
|-id=480 bgcolor=#d6d6d6
| 548480 ||  || — || May 5, 2010 || Kitt Peak || Spacewatch || Tj (2.99) || align=right | 3.2 km || 
|-id=481 bgcolor=#E9E9E9
| 548481 ||  || — || October 15, 2007 || Catalina || CSS ||  || align=right | 2.9 km || 
|-id=482 bgcolor=#fefefe
| 548482 ||  || — || September 28, 2003 || Anderson Mesa || LONEOS ||  || align=right | 1.1 km || 
|-id=483 bgcolor=#fefefe
| 548483 ||  || — || October 11, 2007 || Lulin || LUSS ||  || align=right | 1.1 km || 
|-id=484 bgcolor=#d6d6d6
| 548484 ||  || — || November 17, 2007 || Mount Lemmon || Mount Lemmon Survey ||  || align=right | 3.3 km || 
|-id=485 bgcolor=#d6d6d6
| 548485 ||  || — || September 27, 2006 || Bergisch Gladbach || W. Bickel ||  || align=right | 3.7 km || 
|-id=486 bgcolor=#d6d6d6
| 548486 ||  || — || November 27, 2013 || Haleakala || Pan-STARRS ||  || align=right | 2.4 km || 
|-id=487 bgcolor=#d6d6d6
| 548487 ||  || — || November 27, 2013 || Haleakala || Pan-STARRS ||  || align=right | 3.2 km || 
|-id=488 bgcolor=#E9E9E9
| 548488 ||  || — || June 13, 2010 || Mount Lemmon || Mount Lemmon Survey ||  || align=right | 2.1 km || 
|-id=489 bgcolor=#E9E9E9
| 548489 ||  || — || June 17, 2010 || Mount Lemmon || Mount Lemmon Survey ||  || align=right | 1.2 km || 
|-id=490 bgcolor=#d6d6d6
| 548490 ||  || — || June 17, 2010 || Mount Lemmon || Mount Lemmon Survey ||  || align=right | 2.0 km || 
|-id=491 bgcolor=#fefefe
| 548491 ||  || — || May 7, 2010 || Kitt Peak || Spacewatch ||  || align=right data-sort-value="0.82" | 820 m || 
|-id=492 bgcolor=#d6d6d6
| 548492 ||  || — || October 9, 2013 || Kitt Peak || Spacewatch ||  || align=right | 3.4 km || 
|-id=493 bgcolor=#E9E9E9
| 548493 ||  || — || October 12, 2016 || Kitt Peak || Spacewatch ||  || align=right | 2.0 km || 
|-id=494 bgcolor=#fefefe
| 548494 ||  || — || October 23, 2011 || Haleakala || Pan-STARRS ||  || align=right | 1.0 km || 
|-id=495 bgcolor=#fefefe
| 548495 ||  || — || January 19, 2016 || Haleakala || Pan-STARRS ||  || align=right data-sort-value="0.71" | 710 m || 
|-id=496 bgcolor=#fefefe
| 548496 ||  || — || January 19, 2013 || Kitt Peak || Spacewatch ||  || align=right data-sort-value="0.73" | 730 m || 
|-id=497 bgcolor=#fefefe
| 548497 ||  || — || June 18, 2010 || Mount Lemmon || Mount Lemmon Survey || H || align=right data-sort-value="0.70" | 700 m || 
|-id=498 bgcolor=#d6d6d6
| 548498 ||  || — || July 9, 2010 || WISE || WISE ||  || align=right | 3.1 km || 
|-id=499 bgcolor=#fefefe
| 548499 ||  || — || June 18, 2010 || Mount Lemmon || Mount Lemmon Survey ||  || align=right data-sort-value="0.86" | 860 m || 
|-id=500 bgcolor=#d6d6d6
| 548500 ||  || — || November 18, 2007 || Kitt Peak || Spacewatch ||  || align=right | 2.6 km || 
|}

548501–548600 

|-bgcolor=#d6d6d6
| 548501 ||  || — || February 18, 2015 || Mount Lemmon || Mount Lemmon Survey ||  || align=right | 2.8 km || 
|-id=502 bgcolor=#d6d6d6
| 548502 ||  || — || April 12, 2010 || Mount Lemmon || Mount Lemmon Survey ||  || align=right | 2.4 km || 
|-id=503 bgcolor=#E9E9E9
| 548503 ||  || — || December 23, 2012 || Haleakala || Pan-STARRS ||  || align=right | 1.9 km || 
|-id=504 bgcolor=#C2E0FF
| 548504 ||  || — || May 13, 2010 || Haleakala || Pan-STARRS || cubewano (cold) || align=right | 233 km || 
|-id=505 bgcolor=#fefefe
| 548505 ||  || — || September 21, 2011 || Kitt Peak || Spacewatch ||  || align=right data-sort-value="0.82" | 820 m || 
|-id=506 bgcolor=#E9E9E9
| 548506 ||  || — || August 8, 2015 || Haleakala || Pan-STARRS ||  || align=right | 1.9 km || 
|-id=507 bgcolor=#E9E9E9
| 548507 ||  || — || March 20, 1999 || Apache Point || SDSS Collaboration ||  || align=right | 2.4 km || 
|-id=508 bgcolor=#E9E9E9
| 548508 ||  || — || July 21, 2010 || Bisei SG Center || N. Hashimoto, T. Sakamoto ||  || align=right | 2.2 km || 
|-id=509 bgcolor=#d6d6d6
| 548509 ||  || — || August 11, 2015 || Haleakala || Pan-STARRS ||  || align=right | 2.5 km || 
|-id=510 bgcolor=#d6d6d6
| 548510 ||  || — || November 3, 2007 || Mount Lemmon || Mount Lemmon Survey ||  || align=right | 2.8 km || 
|-id=511 bgcolor=#d6d6d6
| 548511 ||  || — || August 28, 2006 || Kitt Peak || Spacewatch ||  || align=right | 2.8 km || 
|-id=512 bgcolor=#fefefe
| 548512 ||  || — || August 7, 2010 || XuYi || PMO NEO ||  || align=right data-sort-value="0.65" | 650 m || 
|-id=513 bgcolor=#E9E9E9
| 548513 ||  || — || September 27, 2006 || Catalina || CSS ||  || align=right | 1.8 km || 
|-id=514 bgcolor=#fefefe
| 548514 ||  || — || August 7, 2010 || La Sagra || OAM Obs. ||  || align=right data-sort-value="0.64" | 640 m || 
|-id=515 bgcolor=#d6d6d6
| 548515 ||  || — || July 31, 2005 || Palomar || NEAT ||  || align=right | 2.2 km || 
|-id=516 bgcolor=#fefefe
| 548516 ||  || — || April 28, 2012 || Mount Lemmon || Mount Lemmon Survey || H || align=right data-sort-value="0.79" | 790 m || 
|-id=517 bgcolor=#fefefe
| 548517 ||  || — || August 5, 2010 || La Sagra || OAM Obs. ||  || align=right data-sort-value="0.75" | 750 m || 
|-id=518 bgcolor=#fefefe
| 548518 ||  || — || August 3, 2010 || XuYi || PMO NEO ||  || align=right data-sort-value="0.62" | 620 m || 
|-id=519 bgcolor=#E9E9E9
| 548519 ||  || — || August 20, 2010 || Bergisch Gladbach || W. Bickel ||  || align=right | 1.6 km || 
|-id=520 bgcolor=#d6d6d6
| 548520 ||  || — || September 6, 2005 || Anderson Mesa || LONEOS ||  || align=right | 1.3 km || 
|-id=521 bgcolor=#d6d6d6
| 548521 ||  || — || October 26, 2011 || Haleakala || Pan-STARRS || 7:4 || align=right | 5.1 km || 
|-id=522 bgcolor=#fefefe
| 548522 ||  || — || September 2, 2010 || Mount Lemmon || Mount Lemmon Survey ||  || align=right data-sort-value="0.68" | 680 m || 
|-id=523 bgcolor=#fefefe
| 548523 ||  || — || September 20, 2000 || Kitt Peak || R. Millis, R. M. Wagner ||  || align=right data-sort-value="0.59" | 590 m || 
|-id=524 bgcolor=#E9E9E9
| 548524 ||  || — || September 4, 2010 || La Sagra || OAM Obs. ||  || align=right | 1.7 km || 
|-id=525 bgcolor=#E9E9E9
| 548525 ||  || — || September 4, 2010 || Kitt Peak || Spacewatch || MAR || align=right data-sort-value="0.97" | 970 m || 
|-id=526 bgcolor=#E9E9E9
| 548526 ||  || — || September 5, 2010 || Mount Lemmon || Mount Lemmon Survey ||  || align=right | 1.5 km || 
|-id=527 bgcolor=#E9E9E9
| 548527 ||  || — || September 5, 2010 || Mount Lemmon || Mount Lemmon Survey ||  || align=right data-sort-value="0.90" | 900 m || 
|-id=528 bgcolor=#E9E9E9
| 548528 ||  || — || September 7, 2010 || La Sagra || OAM Obs. ||  || align=right | 1.7 km || 
|-id=529 bgcolor=#fefefe
| 548529 ||  || — || August 20, 2000 || Kitt Peak || Spacewatch ||  || align=right data-sort-value="0.59" | 590 m || 
|-id=530 bgcolor=#E9E9E9
| 548530 ||  || — || September 8, 2010 || Charleston || R. Holmes ||  || align=right | 1.6 km || 
|-id=531 bgcolor=#d6d6d6
| 548531 ||  || — || September 8, 2010 || Plana || F. Fratev ||  || align=right | 3.2 km || 
|-id=532 bgcolor=#E9E9E9
| 548532 ||  || — || September 9, 2010 || Kitt Peak || Spacewatch ||  || align=right | 1.5 km || 
|-id=533 bgcolor=#E9E9E9
| 548533 ||  || — || September 2, 2010 || Mount Lemmon || Mount Lemmon Survey ||  || align=right | 1.1 km || 
|-id=534 bgcolor=#fefefe
| 548534 ||  || — || September 9, 2010 || La Sagra || OAM Obs. ||  || align=right data-sort-value="0.67" | 670 m || 
|-id=535 bgcolor=#E9E9E9
| 548535 ||  || — || June 18, 2010 || Kitt Peak || Spacewatch ||  || align=right | 1.2 km || 
|-id=536 bgcolor=#E9E9E9
| 548536 ||  || — || September 10, 2010 || Mount Lemmon || Mount Lemmon Survey ||  || align=right data-sort-value="0.82" | 820 m || 
|-id=537 bgcolor=#E9E9E9
| 548537 ||  || — || September 2, 2010 || Mount Lemmon || Mount Lemmon Survey ||  || align=right | 1.6 km || 
|-id=538 bgcolor=#E9E9E9
| 548538 ||  || — || September 2, 2010 || Mount Lemmon || Mount Lemmon Survey ||  || align=right data-sort-value="0.86" | 860 m || 
|-id=539 bgcolor=#E9E9E9
| 548539 ||  || — || May 4, 2009 || Mount Lemmon || Mount Lemmon Survey ||  || align=right data-sort-value="0.86" | 860 m || 
|-id=540 bgcolor=#E9E9E9
| 548540 ||  || — || December 31, 2007 || Mount Lemmon || Mount Lemmon Survey ||  || align=right | 1.5 km || 
|-id=541 bgcolor=#fefefe
| 548541 ||  || — || September 10, 2010 || Kitt Peak || Spacewatch ||  || align=right data-sort-value="0.57" | 570 m || 
|-id=542 bgcolor=#E9E9E9
| 548542 ||  || — || October 19, 2006 || Kitt Peak || Spacewatch || RAF || align=right data-sort-value="0.73" | 730 m || 
|-id=543 bgcolor=#E9E9E9
| 548543 ||  || — || September 2, 2010 || Mount Lemmon || Mount Lemmon Survey ||  || align=right | 2.0 km || 
|-id=544 bgcolor=#fefefe
| 548544 ||  || — || August 6, 2010 || Kitt Peak || Spacewatch ||  || align=right data-sort-value="0.52" | 520 m || 
|-id=545 bgcolor=#E9E9E9
| 548545 ||  || — || September 11, 2010 || Catalina || CSS || ADE || align=right | 1.7 km || 
|-id=546 bgcolor=#E9E9E9
| 548546 ||  || — || September 11, 2010 || Kitt Peak || Spacewatch ||  || align=right | 1.2 km || 
|-id=547 bgcolor=#fefefe
| 548547 ||  || — || September 4, 2010 || La Sagra || OAM Obs. ||  || align=right data-sort-value="0.65" | 650 m || 
|-id=548 bgcolor=#d6d6d6
| 548548 ||  || — || September 10, 2010 || Mount Lemmon || Mount Lemmon Survey ||  || align=right | 2.1 km || 
|-id=549 bgcolor=#d6d6d6
| 548549 ||  || — || September 10, 2010 || Mount Lemmon || Mount Lemmon Survey ||  || align=right | 2.4 km || 
|-id=550 bgcolor=#E9E9E9
| 548550 ||  || — || March 12, 2008 || Mount Lemmon || Mount Lemmon Survey ||  || align=right | 1.7 km || 
|-id=551 bgcolor=#E9E9E9
| 548551 ||  || — || August 24, 2001 || Palomar || NEAT ||  || align=right | 1.8 km || 
|-id=552 bgcolor=#E9E9E9
| 548552 ||  || — || September 14, 2010 || Kitt Peak || Spacewatch ||  || align=right | 1.5 km || 
|-id=553 bgcolor=#E9E9E9
| 548553 ||  || — || March 27, 2004 || Kitt Peak || Spacewatch ||  || align=right | 1.6 km || 
|-id=554 bgcolor=#E9E9E9
| 548554 ||  || — || November 20, 2006 || Kitt Peak || Spacewatch ||  || align=right | 1.5 km || 
|-id=555 bgcolor=#E9E9E9
| 548555 ||  || — || March 10, 2004 || Palomar || NEAT || EUN || align=right | 1.3 km || 
|-id=556 bgcolor=#E9E9E9
| 548556 ||  || — || February 12, 2003 || Haleakala || AMOS || (1547) || align=right | 1.8 km || 
|-id=557 bgcolor=#E9E9E9
| 548557 ||  || — || September 1, 2010 || Mount Lemmon || Mount Lemmon Survey ||  || align=right | 1.3 km || 
|-id=558 bgcolor=#d6d6d6
| 548558 ||  || — || September 5, 2010 || Mount Lemmon || Mount Lemmon Survey ||  || align=right | 2.2 km || 
|-id=559 bgcolor=#fefefe
| 548559 ||  || — || August 12, 2010 || Kitt Peak || Spacewatch ||  || align=right data-sort-value="0.65" | 650 m || 
|-id=560 bgcolor=#fefefe
| 548560 ||  || — || September 4, 2010 || Kitt Peak || Spacewatch ||  || align=right data-sort-value="0.59" | 590 m || 
|-id=561 bgcolor=#E9E9E9
| 548561 ||  || — || September 10, 2010 || Kitt Peak || Spacewatch ||  || align=right | 2.2 km || 
|-id=562 bgcolor=#fefefe
| 548562 ||  || — || September 1, 2010 || Mount Lemmon || Mount Lemmon Survey ||  || align=right data-sort-value="0.57" | 570 m || 
|-id=563 bgcolor=#E9E9E9
| 548563 ||  || — || April 13, 2013 || Mount Lemmon || Mount Lemmon Survey ||  || align=right | 1.3 km || 
|-id=564 bgcolor=#E9E9E9
| 548564 ||  || — || December 12, 2006 || Kitt Peak || Spacewatch ||  || align=right | 1.5 km || 
|-id=565 bgcolor=#E9E9E9
| 548565 ||  || — || February 1, 2012 || Mount Lemmon || Mount Lemmon Survey ||  || align=right | 1.5 km || 
|-id=566 bgcolor=#E9E9E9
| 548566 ||  || — || September 11, 2010 || Mount Lemmon || Mount Lemmon Survey ||  || align=right | 1.8 km || 
|-id=567 bgcolor=#E9E9E9
| 548567 ||  || — || January 28, 2017 || Haleakala || Pan-STARRS ||  || align=right | 1.0 km || 
|-id=568 bgcolor=#fefefe
| 548568 ||  || — || September 11, 2010 || ESA OGS || ESA OGS ||  || align=right data-sort-value="0.54" | 540 m || 
|-id=569 bgcolor=#d6d6d6
| 548569 ||  || — || September 9, 2015 || Haleakala || Pan-STARRS ||  || align=right | 2.3 km || 
|-id=570 bgcolor=#E9E9E9
| 548570 ||  || — || November 10, 2015 || Mount Lemmon || Mount Lemmon Survey ||  || align=right data-sort-value="0.98" | 980 m || 
|-id=571 bgcolor=#E9E9E9
| 548571 ||  || — || September 14, 2010 || Kitt Peak || Spacewatch ||  || align=right | 1.2 km || 
|-id=572 bgcolor=#E9E9E9
| 548572 ||  || — || September 3, 2010 || Mount Lemmon || Mount Lemmon Survey ||  || align=right | 1.5 km || 
|-id=573 bgcolor=#E9E9E9
| 548573 ||  || — || September 11, 2010 || Mount Lemmon || Mount Lemmon Survey ||  || align=right | 2.0 km || 
|-id=574 bgcolor=#E9E9E9
| 548574 ||  || — || December 3, 2015 || Haleakala || Pan-STARRS ||  || align=right | 1.4 km || 
|-id=575 bgcolor=#E9E9E9
| 548575 ||  || — || February 13, 2012 || Haleakala || Pan-STARRS ||  || align=right | 1.3 km || 
|-id=576 bgcolor=#d6d6d6
| 548576 ||  || — || September 2, 2010 || Mount Lemmon || Mount Lemmon Survey ||  || align=right | 1.9 km || 
|-id=577 bgcolor=#d6d6d6
| 548577 ||  || — || September 10, 2010 || Mount Lemmon || Mount Lemmon Survey ||  || align=right | 2.0 km || 
|-id=578 bgcolor=#d6d6d6
| 548578 ||  || — || November 30, 2011 || Mount Lemmon || Mount Lemmon Survey ||  || align=right | 2.5 km || 
|-id=579 bgcolor=#E9E9E9
| 548579 ||  || — || September 4, 2010 || Kitt Peak || Spacewatch ||  || align=right | 1.2 km || 
|-id=580 bgcolor=#E9E9E9
| 548580 ||  || — || September 4, 2010 || Mount Lemmon || Mount Lemmon Survey ||  || align=right data-sort-value="0.90" | 900 m || 
|-id=581 bgcolor=#d6d6d6
| 548581 ||  || — || September 15, 2010 || Kitt Peak || Spacewatch ||  || align=right | 1.9 km || 
|-id=582 bgcolor=#E9E9E9
| 548582 ||  || — || September 15, 2010 || Mount Lemmon || Mount Lemmon Survey ||  || align=right | 1.1 km || 
|-id=583 bgcolor=#d6d6d6
| 548583 ||  || — || December 14, 2006 || Kitt Peak || Spacewatch ||  || align=right | 2.2 km || 
|-id=584 bgcolor=#E9E9E9
| 548584 ||  || — || September 16, 2010 || Mount Lemmon || Mount Lemmon Survey ||  || align=right data-sort-value="0.86" | 860 m || 
|-id=585 bgcolor=#FA8072
| 548585 ||  || — || September 16, 2010 || Mount Lemmon || Mount Lemmon Survey ||  || align=right | 1.0 km || 
|-id=586 bgcolor=#E9E9E9
| 548586 ||  || — || October 19, 2006 || Kitt Peak || Spacewatch ||  || align=right | 1.8 km || 
|-id=587 bgcolor=#fefefe
| 548587 ||  || — || September 14, 2010 || Kitt Peak || Spacewatch ||  || align=right data-sort-value="0.47" | 470 m || 
|-id=588 bgcolor=#d6d6d6
| 548588 ||  || — || September 29, 2010 || Kitt Peak || Spacewatch ||  || align=right | 2.1 km || 
|-id=589 bgcolor=#fefefe
| 548589 ||  || — || September 6, 2010 || La Sagra || OAM Obs. ||  || align=right data-sort-value="0.83" | 830 m || 
|-id=590 bgcolor=#E9E9E9
| 548590 ||  || — || September 30, 2010 || Catalina || CSS ||  || align=right | 2.8 km || 
|-id=591 bgcolor=#FA8072
| 548591 ||  || — || September 19, 2010 || Kitt Peak || Spacewatch ||  || align=right | 1.4 km || 
|-id=592 bgcolor=#E9E9E9
| 548592 ||  || — || December 21, 2006 || Kitt Peak || Spacewatch ||  || align=right | 2.4 km || 
|-id=593 bgcolor=#E9E9E9
| 548593 ||  || — || September 18, 2010 || Mount Lemmon || Mount Lemmon Survey ||  || align=right data-sort-value="0.90" | 900 m || 
|-id=594 bgcolor=#E9E9E9
| 548594 ||  || — || April 18, 2009 || Mount Lemmon || Mount Lemmon Survey ||  || align=right data-sort-value="0.94" | 940 m || 
|-id=595 bgcolor=#E9E9E9
| 548595 ||  || — || September 18, 2010 || Mount Lemmon || Mount Lemmon Survey ||  || align=right | 1.0 km || 
|-id=596 bgcolor=#d6d6d6
| 548596 ||  || — || September 18, 2010 || Mount Lemmon || Mount Lemmon Survey ||  || align=right | 2.3 km || 
|-id=597 bgcolor=#E9E9E9
| 548597 ||  || — || September 17, 2010 || Kitt Peak || Spacewatch ||  || align=right | 1.4 km || 
|-id=598 bgcolor=#E9E9E9
| 548598 ||  || — || January 29, 2012 || Haleakala || Pan-STARRS ||  || align=right | 1.7 km || 
|-id=599 bgcolor=#fefefe
| 548599 ||  || — || September 29, 2010 || Mount Lemmon || Mount Lemmon Survey ||  || align=right data-sort-value="0.55" | 550 m || 
|-id=600 bgcolor=#E9E9E9
| 548600 ||  || — || August 21, 2014 || Haleakala || Pan-STARRS ||  || align=right | 1.3 km || 
|}

548601–548700 

|-bgcolor=#fefefe
| 548601 ||  || — || September 17, 2010 || Kitt Peak || Spacewatch ||  || align=right data-sort-value="0.52" | 520 m || 
|-id=602 bgcolor=#FA8072
| 548602 ||  || — || October 2, 2010 || La Sagra || OAM Obs. ||  || align=right data-sort-value="0.59" | 590 m || 
|-id=603 bgcolor=#E9E9E9
| 548603 ||  || — || October 2, 2010 || Kitt Peak || Spacewatch ||  || align=right data-sort-value="0.78" | 780 m || 
|-id=604 bgcolor=#E9E9E9
| 548604 ||  || — || October 1, 2010 || Socorro || LINEAR ||  || align=right | 1.8 km || 
|-id=605 bgcolor=#d6d6d6
| 548605 ||  || — || October 2, 2010 || Nogales || M. Schwartz, P. R. Holvorcem ||  || align=right | 2.8 km || 
|-id=606 bgcolor=#E9E9E9
| 548606 ||  || — || October 3, 2010 || Kitt Peak || Spacewatch ||  || align=right | 1.2 km || 
|-id=607 bgcolor=#E9E9E9
| 548607 ||  || — || October 3, 2010 || Kitt Peak || Spacewatch ||  || align=right | 1.8 km || 
|-id=608 bgcolor=#E9E9E9
| 548608 ||  || — || October 1, 2010 || La Sagra || OAM Obs. ||  || align=right | 1.8 km || 
|-id=609 bgcolor=#E9E9E9
| 548609 ||  || — || September 9, 2010 || Kitt Peak || Spacewatch ||  || align=right | 1.5 km || 
|-id=610 bgcolor=#E9E9E9
| 548610 ||  || — || December 17, 2007 || Kitt Peak || Spacewatch ||  || align=right | 1.2 km || 
|-id=611 bgcolor=#E9E9E9
| 548611 ||  || — || April 6, 2008 || Mount Lemmon || Mount Lemmon Survey ||  || align=right | 1.3 km || 
|-id=612 bgcolor=#d6d6d6
| 548612 ||  || — || October 3, 2010 || Kitt Peak || Spacewatch ||  || align=right | 1.7 km || 
|-id=613 bgcolor=#E9E9E9
| 548613 ||  || — || October 4, 2006 || Mount Lemmon || Mount Lemmon Survey ||  || align=right | 1.1 km || 
|-id=614 bgcolor=#E9E9E9
| 548614 ||  || — || October 7, 2010 || Socorro || LINEAR ||  || align=right | 1.9 km || 
|-id=615 bgcolor=#d6d6d6
| 548615 ||  || — || October 8, 2010 || Kitt Peak || Spacewatch ||  || align=right | 2.8 km || 
|-id=616 bgcolor=#fefefe
| 548616 ||  || — || September 10, 2010 || Kitt Peak || Spacewatch ||  || align=right data-sort-value="0.47" | 470 m || 
|-id=617 bgcolor=#E9E9E9
| 548617 ||  || — || September 21, 2001 || Kitt Peak || Spacewatch ||  || align=right | 1.8 km || 
|-id=618 bgcolor=#d6d6d6
| 548618 ||  || — || October 6, 2010 || Marly || P. Kocher ||  || align=right | 2.2 km || 
|-id=619 bgcolor=#E9E9E9
| 548619 ||  || — || October 7, 2010 || Kitt Peak || Spacewatch ||  || align=right | 1.6 km || 
|-id=620 bgcolor=#d6d6d6
| 548620 ||  || — || September 15, 2010 || Kitt Peak || Spacewatch ||  || align=right | 2.0 km || 
|-id=621 bgcolor=#E9E9E9
| 548621 ||  || — || February 18, 2008 || Mount Lemmon || Mount Lemmon Survey ||  || align=right | 1.4 km || 
|-id=622 bgcolor=#E9E9E9
| 548622 ||  || — || October 8, 2010 || Kitt Peak || Spacewatch ||  || align=right | 1.2 km || 
|-id=623 bgcolor=#fefefe
| 548623 ||  || — || October 8, 2010 || Charleston || R. Holmes ||  || align=right data-sort-value="0.62" | 620 m || 
|-id=624 bgcolor=#d6d6d6
| 548624 ||  || — || September 15, 2010 || Charleston || R. Holmes ||  || align=right | 2.4 km || 
|-id=625 bgcolor=#fefefe
| 548625 ||  || — || September 15, 2010 || Kitt Peak || Spacewatch ||  || align=right data-sort-value="0.49" | 490 m || 
|-id=626 bgcolor=#E9E9E9
| 548626 ||  || — || March 10, 2008 || Kitt Peak || Spacewatch ||  || align=right | 1.3 km || 
|-id=627 bgcolor=#E9E9E9
| 548627 ||  || — || February 10, 2008 || Kitt Peak || Spacewatch ||  || align=right | 1.3 km || 
|-id=628 bgcolor=#d6d6d6
| 548628 ||  || — || November 1, 2005 || Kitt Peak || Spacewatch || critical || align=right | 1.7 km || 
|-id=629 bgcolor=#E9E9E9
| 548629 ||  || — || October 9, 2010 || Mount Lemmon || Mount Lemmon Survey ||  || align=right | 1.0 km || 
|-id=630 bgcolor=#E9E9E9
| 548630 ||  || — || October 12, 2006 || Palomar || NEAT ||  || align=right | 1.0 km || 
|-id=631 bgcolor=#E9E9E9
| 548631 ||  || — || October 9, 2010 || Kitt Peak || Spacewatch ||  || align=right | 1.9 km || 
|-id=632 bgcolor=#E9E9E9
| 548632 ||  || — || February 10, 2008 || Mount Lemmon || Mount Lemmon Survey ||  || align=right | 1.4 km || 
|-id=633 bgcolor=#E9E9E9
| 548633 ||  || — || November 17, 2006 || Vail-Jarnac || Jarnac Obs. ||  || align=right | 1.3 km || 
|-id=634 bgcolor=#E9E9E9
| 548634 ||  || — || October 11, 2010 || Mount Lemmon || Mount Lemmon Survey ||  || align=right | 2.3 km || 
|-id=635 bgcolor=#E9E9E9
| 548635 ||  || — || August 20, 2001 || Cerro Tololo || Cerro Tololo Obs. ||  || align=right | 1.3 km || 
|-id=636 bgcolor=#E9E9E9
| 548636 ||  || — || April 3, 2008 || Mount Lemmon || Mount Lemmon Survey ||  || align=right | 2.1 km || 
|-id=637 bgcolor=#E9E9E9
| 548637 ||  || — || September 16, 2010 || Kitt Peak || Spacewatch ||  || align=right | 1.6 km || 
|-id=638 bgcolor=#E9E9E9
| 548638 ||  || — || October 10, 2010 || Kitt Peak || Spacewatch ||  || align=right | 1.5 km || 
|-id=639 bgcolor=#E9E9E9
| 548639 ||  || — || September 11, 2010 || Kitt Peak || Spacewatch ||  || align=right | 1.7 km || 
|-id=640 bgcolor=#E9E9E9
| 548640 ||  || — || January 16, 2008 || Kitt Peak || Spacewatch ||  || align=right data-sort-value="0.86" | 860 m || 
|-id=641 bgcolor=#d6d6d6
| 548641 ||  || — || April 30, 2009 || Mount Lemmon || Mount Lemmon Survey ||  || align=right | 2.3 km || 
|-id=642 bgcolor=#E9E9E9
| 548642 ||  || — || October 13, 2010 || Mount Lemmon || Mount Lemmon Survey ||  || align=right data-sort-value="0.86" | 860 m || 
|-id=643 bgcolor=#E9E9E9
| 548643 ||  || — || September 1, 2010 || Mount Lemmon || Mount Lemmon Survey ||  || align=right | 1.1 km || 
|-id=644 bgcolor=#d6d6d6
| 548644 ||  || — || October 10, 2004 || Kitt Peak || Spacewatch || 7:4 || align=right | 3.1 km || 
|-id=645 bgcolor=#fefefe
| 548645 ||  || — || October 1, 2010 || Kitt Peak || Spacewatch ||  || align=right data-sort-value="0.54" | 540 m || 
|-id=646 bgcolor=#E9E9E9
| 548646 ||  || — || October 16, 1993 || Kitt Peak || Spacewatch ||  || align=right | 1.3 km || 
|-id=647 bgcolor=#E9E9E9
| 548647 ||  || — || October 14, 2010 || Mount Lemmon || Mount Lemmon Survey ||  || align=right | 1.5 km || 
|-id=648 bgcolor=#E9E9E9
| 548648 ||  || — || October 2, 2006 || Mount Lemmon || Mount Lemmon Survey ||  || align=right | 1.7 km || 
|-id=649 bgcolor=#E9E9E9
| 548649 ||  || — || August 9, 2005 || Cerro Tololo || Cerro Tololo Obs. ||  || align=right | 1.5 km || 
|-id=650 bgcolor=#E9E9E9
| 548650 ||  || — || September 18, 2001 || Kitt Peak || Spacewatch ||  || align=right | 1.5 km || 
|-id=651 bgcolor=#E9E9E9
| 548651 ||  || — || December 26, 2006 || Kitt Peak || Spacewatch ||  || align=right | 1.8 km || 
|-id=652 bgcolor=#E9E9E9
| 548652 ||  || — || October 2, 2010 || Mount Lemmon || Mount Lemmon Survey ||  || align=right | 2.4 km || 
|-id=653 bgcolor=#E9E9E9
| 548653 ||  || — || October 9, 2010 || Mount Lemmon || Mount Lemmon Survey ||  || align=right | 1.3 km || 
|-id=654 bgcolor=#E9E9E9
| 548654 ||  || — || October 2, 2010 || Kitt Peak || Spacewatch ||  || align=right data-sort-value="0.94" | 940 m || 
|-id=655 bgcolor=#E9E9E9
| 548655 ||  || — || October 1, 2010 || Mount Lemmon || Mount Lemmon Survey ||  || align=right | 1.2 km || 
|-id=656 bgcolor=#d6d6d6
| 548656 ||  || — || March 24, 2014 || Haleakala || Pan-STARRS || 7:4 || align=right | 4.0 km || 
|-id=657 bgcolor=#d6d6d6
| 548657 ||  || — || July 25, 2015 || Haleakala || Pan-STARRS ||  || align=right | 1.9 km || 
|-id=658 bgcolor=#E9E9E9
| 548658 ||  || — || October 2, 2010 || Mount Lemmon || Mount Lemmon Survey ||  || align=right | 2.8 km || 
|-id=659 bgcolor=#E9E9E9
| 548659 ||  || — || October 12, 2010 || Kitt Peak || Spacewatch ||  || align=right | 1.7 km || 
|-id=660 bgcolor=#E9E9E9
| 548660 ||  || — || October 13, 2010 || Mount Lemmon || Mount Lemmon Survey ||  || align=right | 1.9 km || 
|-id=661 bgcolor=#E9E9E9
| 548661 ||  || — || February 23, 2012 || Mount Lemmon || Mount Lemmon Survey ||  || align=right | 1.9 km || 
|-id=662 bgcolor=#E9E9E9
| 548662 ||  || — || October 12, 2010 || Mount Lemmon || Mount Lemmon Survey ||  || align=right | 1.7 km || 
|-id=663 bgcolor=#E9E9E9
| 548663 ||  || — || October 8, 2010 || Kitt Peak || Spacewatch ||  || align=right | 1.1 km || 
|-id=664 bgcolor=#E9E9E9
| 548664 ||  || — || October 2, 2010 || Mount Lemmon || Mount Lemmon Survey ||  || align=right | 1.8 km || 
|-id=665 bgcolor=#fefefe
| 548665 ||  || — || September 26, 2017 || Haleakala || Pan-STARRS ||  || align=right data-sort-value="0.57" | 570 m || 
|-id=666 bgcolor=#E9E9E9
| 548666 ||  || — || October 14, 2010 || Mount Lemmon || Mount Lemmon Survey ||  || align=right | 1.3 km || 
|-id=667 bgcolor=#E9E9E9
| 548667 ||  || — || October 11, 2010 || Kitt Peak || Spacewatch ||  || align=right | 1.3 km || 
|-id=668 bgcolor=#fefefe
| 548668 ||  || — || August 12, 2013 || Haleakala || Pan-STARRS ||  || align=right data-sort-value="0.68" | 680 m || 
|-id=669 bgcolor=#E9E9E9
| 548669 ||  || — || October 13, 2010 || Mount Lemmon || Mount Lemmon Survey ||  || align=right | 1.6 km || 
|-id=670 bgcolor=#E9E9E9
| 548670 ||  || — || October 13, 2010 || Mount Lemmon || Mount Lemmon Survey ||  || align=right | 1.3 km || 
|-id=671 bgcolor=#E9E9E9
| 548671 ||  || — || February 14, 2012 || Haleakala || Pan-STARRS ||  || align=right | 1.3 km || 
|-id=672 bgcolor=#E9E9E9
| 548672 ||  || — || October 9, 2010 || Mount Lemmon || Mount Lemmon Survey ||  || align=right | 1.5 km || 
|-id=673 bgcolor=#E9E9E9
| 548673 ||  || — || October 1, 2010 || Mount Lemmon || Mount Lemmon Survey ||  || align=right data-sort-value="0.82" | 820 m || 
|-id=674 bgcolor=#d6d6d6
| 548674 ||  || — || October 1, 2010 || Mount Lemmon || Mount Lemmon Survey ||  || align=right | 2.0 km || 
|-id=675 bgcolor=#d6d6d6
| 548675 ||  || — || October 1, 2010 || Mount Lemmon || Mount Lemmon Survey ||  || align=right | 2.1 km || 
|-id=676 bgcolor=#fefefe
| 548676 ||  || — || October 12, 2010 || Mount Lemmon || Mount Lemmon Survey ||  || align=right data-sort-value="0.45" | 450 m || 
|-id=677 bgcolor=#E9E9E9
| 548677 ||  || — || October 17, 2010 || Mount Lemmon || Mount Lemmon Survey ||  || align=right | 1.5 km || 
|-id=678 bgcolor=#E9E9E9
| 548678 ||  || — || October 17, 2010 || Mount Lemmon || Mount Lemmon Survey ||  || align=right | 2.1 km || 
|-id=679 bgcolor=#fefefe
| 548679 ||  || — || September 17, 2003 || Kitt Peak || Spacewatch ||  || align=right data-sort-value="0.52" | 520 m || 
|-id=680 bgcolor=#E9E9E9
| 548680 ||  || — || September 17, 2010 || Mount Lemmon || Mount Lemmon Survey ||  || align=right | 2.3 km || 
|-id=681 bgcolor=#E9E9E9
| 548681 ||  || — || October 16, 2010 || Mayhill-ISON || L. Elenin ||  || align=right | 2.1 km || 
|-id=682 bgcolor=#E9E9E9
| 548682 ||  || — || December 20, 2006 || Ottmarsheim || C. Rinner ||  || align=right | 1.5 km || 
|-id=683 bgcolor=#E9E9E9
| 548683 ||  || — || October 28, 2010 || Mount Lemmon || Mount Lemmon Survey ||  || align=right | 1.6 km || 
|-id=684 bgcolor=#E9E9E9
| 548684 ||  || — || January 29, 2003 || Apache Point || SDSS Collaboration ||  || align=right | 1.1 km || 
|-id=685 bgcolor=#E9E9E9
| 548685 ||  || — || September 17, 2010 || Mount Lemmon || Mount Lemmon Survey ||  || align=right | 1.4 km || 
|-id=686 bgcolor=#E9E9E9
| 548686 ||  || — || October 17, 2010 || Mount Lemmon || Mount Lemmon Survey ||  || align=right | 1.7 km || 
|-id=687 bgcolor=#E9E9E9
| 548687 ||  || — || December 13, 2006 || Kitt Peak || Spacewatch ||  || align=right | 1.5 km || 
|-id=688 bgcolor=#fefefe
| 548688 ||  || — || September 20, 2003 || Anderson Mesa || LONEOS ||  || align=right data-sort-value="0.59" | 590 m || 
|-id=689 bgcolor=#E9E9E9
| 548689 ||  || — || October 17, 2010 || Catalina || CSS || EUN || align=right | 1.2 km || 
|-id=690 bgcolor=#E9E9E9
| 548690 ||  || — || October 28, 2010 || Piszkesteto || Z. Kuli, K. Sárneczky ||  || align=right | 1.6 km || 
|-id=691 bgcolor=#E9E9E9
| 548691 ||  || — || October 29, 2010 || Mount Lemmon || Mount Lemmon Survey ||  || align=right | 1.5 km || 
|-id=692 bgcolor=#E9E9E9
| 548692 ||  || — || October 15, 2001 || Kitt Peak || Spacewatch ||  || align=right | 1.6 km || 
|-id=693 bgcolor=#E9E9E9
| 548693 ||  || — || October 29, 2010 || Mount Lemmon || Mount Lemmon Survey ||  || align=right | 1.4 km || 
|-id=694 bgcolor=#E9E9E9
| 548694 ||  || — || October 14, 2010 || Mount Lemmon || Mount Lemmon Survey ||  || align=right | 1.1 km || 
|-id=695 bgcolor=#E9E9E9
| 548695 ||  || — || October 18, 2001 || Palomar || NEAT ||  || align=right | 2.7 km || 
|-id=696 bgcolor=#E9E9E9
| 548696 ||  || — || October 30, 2010 || Mount Lemmon || Mount Lemmon Survey ||  || align=right | 1.5 km || 
|-id=697 bgcolor=#E9E9E9
| 548697 ||  || — || October 13, 2010 || Mount Lemmon || Mount Lemmon Survey ||  || align=right | 1.3 km || 
|-id=698 bgcolor=#E9E9E9
| 548698 ||  || — || October 31, 2010 || ESA OGS || ESA OGS ||  || align=right | 1.8 km || 
|-id=699 bgcolor=#fefefe
| 548699 ||  || — || October 17, 2010 || Mount Lemmon || Mount Lemmon Survey ||  || align=right data-sort-value="0.68" | 680 m || 
|-id=700 bgcolor=#d6d6d6
| 548700 ||  || — || October 29, 2010 || Kitt Peak || Spacewatch || 3:2 || align=right | 4.0 km || 
|}

548701–548800 

|-bgcolor=#E9E9E9
| 548701 ||  || — || November 20, 2006 || Kitt Peak || Spacewatch ||  || align=right | 1.4 km || 
|-id=702 bgcolor=#E9E9E9
| 548702 ||  || — || October 30, 2010 || Mount Lemmon || Mount Lemmon Survey ||  || align=right | 2.0 km || 
|-id=703 bgcolor=#E9E9E9
| 548703 ||  || — || October 31, 2010 || Piszkesteto || Z. Kuli, K. Sárneczky ||  || align=right | 1.4 km || 
|-id=704 bgcolor=#E9E9E9
| 548704 ||  || — || October 31, 2010 || Kitt Peak || Spacewatch ||  || align=right | 1.8 km || 
|-id=705 bgcolor=#E9E9E9
| 548705 ||  || — || October 4, 2006 || Mount Lemmon || Mount Lemmon Survey ||  || align=right | 1.2 km || 
|-id=706 bgcolor=#E9E9E9
| 548706 ||  || — || October 13, 2001 || Palomar || NEAT || JUN || align=right | 1.1 km || 
|-id=707 bgcolor=#E9E9E9
| 548707 ||  || — || October 29, 2010 || Catalina || CSS ||  || align=right | 2.0 km || 
|-id=708 bgcolor=#E9E9E9
| 548708 ||  || — || October 30, 2010 || Mount Lemmon || Mount Lemmon Survey ||  || align=right | 1.5 km || 
|-id=709 bgcolor=#E9E9E9
| 548709 ||  || — || October 12, 2010 || Mount Lemmon || Mount Lemmon Survey ||  || align=right data-sort-value="0.78" | 780 m || 
|-id=710 bgcolor=#fefefe
| 548710 ||  || — || September 28, 2003 || Kitt Peak || Spacewatch ||  || align=right data-sort-value="0.59" | 590 m || 
|-id=711 bgcolor=#d6d6d6
| 548711 ||  || — || October 2, 2005 || Siding Spring || SSS ||  || align=right | 2.1 km || 
|-id=712 bgcolor=#E9E9E9
| 548712 ||  || — || July 11, 2005 || Kitt Peak || Spacewatch ||  || align=right | 1.8 km || 
|-id=713 bgcolor=#E9E9E9
| 548713 ||  || — || October 3, 2006 || Mount Lemmon || Mount Lemmon Survey ||  || align=right data-sort-value="0.59" | 590 m || 
|-id=714 bgcolor=#E9E9E9
| 548714 ||  || — || November 11, 2010 || Mount Lemmon || Mount Lemmon Survey ||  || align=right | 1.3 km || 
|-id=715 bgcolor=#E9E9E9
| 548715 ||  || — || October 31, 2010 || Andrushivka || P. Kyrylenko, Y. Ivaščenko ||  || align=right | 1.6 km || 
|-id=716 bgcolor=#E9E9E9
| 548716 ||  || — || October 17, 2010 || Mount Lemmon || Mount Lemmon Survey ||  || align=right data-sort-value="0.86" | 860 m || 
|-id=717 bgcolor=#E9E9E9
| 548717 ||  || — || September 17, 2010 || Catalina || CSS ||  || align=right | 2.2 km || 
|-id=718 bgcolor=#d6d6d6
| 548718 ||  || — || October 17, 2010 || Mount Lemmon || Mount Lemmon Survey || 7:4 || align=right | 3.3 km || 
|-id=719 bgcolor=#E9E9E9
| 548719 ||  || — || October 29, 2010 || Mount Lemmon || Mount Lemmon Survey ||  || align=right | 1.4 km || 
|-id=720 bgcolor=#E9E9E9
| 548720 ||  || — || October 17, 2010 || Mount Lemmon || Mount Lemmon Survey ||  || align=right | 1.1 km || 
|-id=721 bgcolor=#E9E9E9
| 548721 ||  || — || October 17, 2010 || Mount Lemmon || Mount Lemmon Survey ||  || align=right | 1.3 km || 
|-id=722 bgcolor=#E9E9E9
| 548722 ||  || — || October 28, 2010 || Mount Lemmon || Mount Lemmon Survey ||  || align=right | 1.9 km || 
|-id=723 bgcolor=#E9E9E9
| 548723 ||  || — || October 17, 2010 || Mount Lemmon || Mount Lemmon Survey ||  || align=right | 2.1 km || 
|-id=724 bgcolor=#E9E9E9
| 548724 ||  || — || September 4, 2014 || Haleakala || Pan-STARRS ||  || align=right | 1.5 km || 
|-id=725 bgcolor=#E9E9E9
| 548725 ||  || — || October 31, 2010 || Mount Lemmon || Mount Lemmon Survey ||  || align=right | 1.2 km || 
|-id=726 bgcolor=#E9E9E9
| 548726 ||  || — || October 31, 2010 || Kitt Peak || Spacewatch ||  || align=right | 1.4 km || 
|-id=727 bgcolor=#fefefe
| 548727 ||  || — || October 17, 2010 || Mount Lemmon || Mount Lemmon Survey ||  || align=right data-sort-value="0.57" | 570 m || 
|-id=728 bgcolor=#E9E9E9
| 548728 ||  || — || November 1, 2010 || Mount Lemmon || Mount Lemmon Survey ||  || align=right | 1.2 km || 
|-id=729 bgcolor=#E9E9E9
| 548729 ||  || — || November 1, 2010 || Mount Lemmon || Mount Lemmon Survey ||  || align=right | 1.3 km || 
|-id=730 bgcolor=#E9E9E9
| 548730 ||  || — || October 12, 2010 || Mount Lemmon || Mount Lemmon Survey ||  || align=right | 2.0 km || 
|-id=731 bgcolor=#E9E9E9
| 548731 ||  || — || February 28, 2008 || Kitt Peak || Spacewatch ||  || align=right | 1.3 km || 
|-id=732 bgcolor=#E9E9E9
| 548732 ||  || — || October 26, 2001 || Palomar || NEAT ||  || align=right | 1.8 km || 
|-id=733 bgcolor=#E9E9E9
| 548733 ||  || — || October 3, 2010 || Catalina || CSS ||  || align=right | 1.6 km || 
|-id=734 bgcolor=#E9E9E9
| 548734 ||  || — || February 10, 1999 || Kitt Peak || Spacewatch ||  || align=right | 1.4 km || 
|-id=735 bgcolor=#E9E9E9
| 548735 ||  || — || January 21, 2007 || Altschwendt || W. Ries ||  || align=right | 2.2 km || 
|-id=736 bgcolor=#E9E9E9
| 548736 ||  || — || September 11, 2010 || Mount Lemmon || Mount Lemmon Survey ||  || align=right | 2.1 km || 
|-id=737 bgcolor=#d6d6d6
| 548737 ||  || — || December 5, 2007 || Mount Lemmon || Mount Lemmon Survey ||  || align=right | 4.3 km || 
|-id=738 bgcolor=#E9E9E9
| 548738 ||  || — || September 18, 2010 || Mount Lemmon || Mount Lemmon Survey ||  || align=right | 1.8 km || 
|-id=739 bgcolor=#E9E9E9
| 548739 ||  || — || August 6, 2005 || Palomar || NEAT ||  || align=right | 1.7 km || 
|-id=740 bgcolor=#d6d6d6
| 548740 ||  || — || November 2, 2010 || Kitt Peak || Spacewatch ||  || align=right | 2.7 km || 
|-id=741 bgcolor=#E9E9E9
| 548741 ||  || — || November 3, 2010 || Kitt Peak || Spacewatch ||  || align=right | 2.3 km || 
|-id=742 bgcolor=#E9E9E9
| 548742 ||  || — || November 3, 2010 || Mount Lemmon || Mount Lemmon Survey ||  || align=right | 1.2 km || 
|-id=743 bgcolor=#E9E9E9
| 548743 ||  || — || November 3, 2010 || Mount Lemmon || Mount Lemmon Survey ||  || align=right | 1.5 km || 
|-id=744 bgcolor=#E9E9E9
| 548744 ||  || — || April 27, 2008 || Mount Lemmon || Mount Lemmon Survey ||  || align=right | 2.7 km || 
|-id=745 bgcolor=#E9E9E9
| 548745 ||  || — || November 2, 2010 || Mount Lemmon || Mount Lemmon Survey ||  || align=right | 1.5 km || 
|-id=746 bgcolor=#E9E9E9
| 548746 ||  || — || November 2, 2010 || Mount Lemmon || Mount Lemmon Survey ||  || align=right | 1.5 km || 
|-id=747 bgcolor=#E9E9E9
| 548747 ||  || — || November 2, 2010 || Mount Lemmon || Mount Lemmon Survey ||  || align=right | 2.0 km || 
|-id=748 bgcolor=#E9E9E9
| 548748 ||  || — || October 11, 2005 || Kitt Peak || Spacewatch ||  || align=right | 2.9 km || 
|-id=749 bgcolor=#E9E9E9
| 548749 ||  || — || November 1, 2010 || Mount Lemmon || Mount Lemmon Survey ||  || align=right | 1.1 km || 
|-id=750 bgcolor=#FA8072
| 548750 ||  || — || February 6, 2007 || Palomar || NEAT ||  || align=right data-sort-value="0.73" | 730 m || 
|-id=751 bgcolor=#E9E9E9
| 548751 ||  || — || November 5, 2010 || Kitt Peak || Spacewatch || GEF || align=right | 1.0 km || 
|-id=752 bgcolor=#E9E9E9
| 548752 ||  || — || November 5, 2010 || Kitt Peak || Spacewatch ||  || align=right | 1.9 km || 
|-id=753 bgcolor=#E9E9E9
| 548753 ||  || — || November 23, 2006 || Kitt Peak || Spacewatch ||  || align=right data-sort-value="0.97" | 970 m || 
|-id=754 bgcolor=#E9E9E9
| 548754 ||  || — || August 31, 2005 || Kitt Peak || Spacewatch ||  || align=right | 1.6 km || 
|-id=755 bgcolor=#E9E9E9
| 548755 ||  || — || November 6, 2010 || Kitt Peak || Spacewatch ||  || align=right | 2.7 km || 
|-id=756 bgcolor=#E9E9E9
| 548756 ||  || — || November 6, 2010 || Kitt Peak || Spacewatch ||  || align=right | 2.5 km || 
|-id=757 bgcolor=#d6d6d6
| 548757 ||  || — || November 4, 2010 || Pla D'Arguines || R. Ferrando, M. Ferrando ||  || align=right | 1.5 km || 
|-id=758 bgcolor=#E9E9E9
| 548758 ||  || — || September 12, 2001 || Kitt Peak || L. H. Wasserman, E. L. Ryan ||  || align=right | 1.4 km || 
|-id=759 bgcolor=#E9E9E9
| 548759 ||  || — || October 14, 2010 || Mount Lemmon || Mount Lemmon Survey ||  || align=right | 1.3 km || 
|-id=760 bgcolor=#E9E9E9
| 548760 ||  || — || August 29, 2005 || Kitt Peak || Spacewatch ||  || align=right | 1.9 km || 
|-id=761 bgcolor=#E9E9E9
| 548761 ||  || — || December 21, 2006 || Kitt Peak || Spacewatch ||  || align=right | 1.7 km || 
|-id=762 bgcolor=#d6d6d6
| 548762 ||  || — || November 5, 2010 || Kitt Peak || Spacewatch ||  || align=right | 2.3 km || 
|-id=763 bgcolor=#E9E9E9
| 548763 ||  || — || November 5, 2010 || Kitt Peak || Spacewatch ||  || align=right | 1.7 km || 
|-id=764 bgcolor=#fefefe
| 548764 ||  || — || November 5, 2010 || Mount Lemmon || Mount Lemmon Survey ||  || align=right data-sort-value="0.49" | 490 m || 
|-id=765 bgcolor=#E9E9E9
| 548765 ||  || — || August 30, 2005 || Kitt Peak || Spacewatch ||  || align=right | 1.4 km || 
|-id=766 bgcolor=#E9E9E9
| 548766 ||  || — || November 6, 2010 || Mount Lemmon || Mount Lemmon Survey ||  || align=right | 1.3 km || 
|-id=767 bgcolor=#E9E9E9
| 548767 ||  || — || October 25, 2001 || Apache Point || SDSS Collaboration ||  || align=right | 1.6 km || 
|-id=768 bgcolor=#E9E9E9
| 548768 ||  || — || November 6, 2010 || Mount Lemmon || Mount Lemmon Survey ||  || align=right | 1.5 km || 
|-id=769 bgcolor=#E9E9E9
| 548769 ||  || — || March 15, 2008 || Kitt Peak || Spacewatch ||  || align=right | 1.5 km || 
|-id=770 bgcolor=#E9E9E9
| 548770 ||  || — || November 7, 2010 || Kitt Peak || Spacewatch ||  || align=right | 2.1 km || 
|-id=771 bgcolor=#E9E9E9
| 548771 ||  || — || September 1, 2005 || Kitt Peak || Spacewatch ||  || align=right | 2.0 km || 
|-id=772 bgcolor=#E9E9E9
| 548772 ||  || — || November 7, 2010 || Mount Lemmon || Mount Lemmon Survey ||  || align=right | 2.1 km || 
|-id=773 bgcolor=#fefefe
| 548773 ||  || — || October 18, 2003 || Anderson Mesa || LONEOS ||  || align=right data-sort-value="0.59" | 590 m || 
|-id=774 bgcolor=#E9E9E9
| 548774 ||  || — || November 8, 2010 || Kitt Peak || Spacewatch ||  || align=right | 1.3 km || 
|-id=775 bgcolor=#E9E9E9
| 548775 ||  || — || September 5, 2010 || Mount Lemmon || Mount Lemmon Survey || (5) || align=right data-sort-value="0.97" | 970 m || 
|-id=776 bgcolor=#d6d6d6
| 548776 ||  || — || August 18, 2009 || Kitt Peak || Spacewatch || 3:2 || align=right | 4.2 km || 
|-id=777 bgcolor=#E9E9E9
| 548777 ||  || — || November 8, 2010 || Kitt Peak || Spacewatch ||  || align=right | 1.9 km || 
|-id=778 bgcolor=#fefefe
| 548778 ||  || — || November 19, 2003 || Kitt Peak || Spacewatch ||  || align=right data-sort-value="0.68" | 680 m || 
|-id=779 bgcolor=#E9E9E9
| 548779 ||  || — || November 8, 2010 || Mount Lemmon || Mount Lemmon Survey ||  || align=right | 2.0 km || 
|-id=780 bgcolor=#E9E9E9
| 548780 ||  || — || October 29, 2010 || Mount Lemmon || Mount Lemmon Survey ||  || align=right | 2.0 km || 
|-id=781 bgcolor=#E9E9E9
| 548781 ||  || — || November 10, 2010 || Mount Lemmon || Mount Lemmon Survey ||  || align=right | 1.8 km || 
|-id=782 bgcolor=#d6d6d6
| 548782 ||  || — || November 1, 2010 || Kitt Peak || Spacewatch ||  || align=right | 1.6 km || 
|-id=783 bgcolor=#E9E9E9
| 548783 ||  || — || October 28, 2010 || Mount Lemmon || Mount Lemmon Survey ||  || align=right | 1.8 km || 
|-id=784 bgcolor=#E9E9E9
| 548784 ||  || — || March 10, 2008 || Mount Lemmon || Mount Lemmon Survey ||  || align=right | 1.4 km || 
|-id=785 bgcolor=#E9E9E9
| 548785 ||  || — || November 6, 2010 || Mount Lemmon || Mount Lemmon Survey ||  || align=right | 1.4 km || 
|-id=786 bgcolor=#E9E9E9
| 548786 ||  || — || November 6, 2010 || Mount Lemmon || Mount Lemmon Survey ||  || align=right | 1.1 km || 
|-id=787 bgcolor=#E9E9E9
| 548787 ||  || — || August 24, 2001 || Haleakala || AMOS ||  || align=right | 1.6 km || 
|-id=788 bgcolor=#E9E9E9
| 548788 ||  || — || September 26, 2005 || Kitt Peak || Spacewatch ||  || align=right | 2.3 km || 
|-id=789 bgcolor=#E9E9E9
| 548789 ||  || — || August 26, 2005 || Palomar || NEAT ||  || align=right | 2.1 km || 
|-id=790 bgcolor=#E9E9E9
| 548790 ||  || — || November 6, 2010 || Mount Lemmon || Mount Lemmon Survey ||  || align=right | 1.7 km || 
|-id=791 bgcolor=#fefefe
| 548791 ||  || — || November 7, 2010 || Mount Lemmon || Mount Lemmon Survey ||  || align=right data-sort-value="0.59" | 590 m || 
|-id=792 bgcolor=#E9E9E9
| 548792 ||  || — || November 7, 2010 || Mount Lemmon || Mount Lemmon Survey ||  || align=right | 1.6 km || 
|-id=793 bgcolor=#E9E9E9
| 548793 ||  || — || November 8, 2010 || Mount Lemmon || Mount Lemmon Survey ||  || align=right | 1.8 km || 
|-id=794 bgcolor=#E9E9E9
| 548794 ||  || — || November 8, 2010 || Mount Lemmon || Mount Lemmon Survey ||  || align=right | 1.8 km || 
|-id=795 bgcolor=#E9E9E9
| 548795 ||  || — || November 10, 2010 || Mount Lemmon || Mount Lemmon Survey ||  || align=right | 1.9 km || 
|-id=796 bgcolor=#E9E9E9
| 548796 ||  || — || November 10, 2010 || Mount Lemmon || Mount Lemmon Survey ||  || align=right | 1.8 km || 
|-id=797 bgcolor=#d6d6d6
| 548797 ||  || — || November 10, 2010 || Mount Lemmon || Mount Lemmon Survey ||  || align=right | 1.8 km || 
|-id=798 bgcolor=#E9E9E9
| 548798 ||  || — || November 11, 2010 || La Sagra || OAM Obs. ||  || align=right | 1.9 km || 
|-id=799 bgcolor=#E9E9E9
| 548799 ||  || — || February 11, 2008 || Kitt Peak || Spacewatch ||  || align=right | 1.5 km || 
|-id=800 bgcolor=#E9E9E9
| 548800 ||  || — || November 12, 2010 || Mount Lemmon || Mount Lemmon Survey ||  || align=right | 2.0 km || 
|}

548801–548900 

|-bgcolor=#E9E9E9
| 548801 ||  || — || October 30, 2010 || Kitt Peak || Spacewatch ||  || align=right | 2.2 km || 
|-id=802 bgcolor=#d6d6d6
| 548802 ||  || — || October 29, 2010 || Kitt Peak || Spacewatch ||  || align=right | 2.0 km || 
|-id=803 bgcolor=#E9E9E9
| 548803 ||  || — || February 7, 2003 || Palomar || NEAT ||  || align=right | 1.0 km || 
|-id=804 bgcolor=#E9E9E9
| 548804 ||  || — || November 6, 2010 || Catalina || CSS ||  || align=right | 2.1 km || 
|-id=805 bgcolor=#E9E9E9
| 548805 ||  || — || October 30, 2010 || Catalina || CSS || JUN || align=right | 1.1 km || 
|-id=806 bgcolor=#E9E9E9
| 548806 ||  || — || November 6, 2010 || La Sagra || OAM Obs. ||  || align=right | 2.0 km || 
|-id=807 bgcolor=#E9E9E9
| 548807 ||  || — || March 8, 2008 || Kitt Peak || Spacewatch ||  || align=right | 1.8 km || 
|-id=808 bgcolor=#E9E9E9
| 548808 ||  || — || October 17, 2010 || Mount Lemmon || Mount Lemmon Survey ||  || align=right | 1.7 km || 
|-id=809 bgcolor=#E9E9E9
| 548809 ||  || — || February 27, 2012 || Kitt Peak || Spacewatch || ADE || align=right | 2.2 km || 
|-id=810 bgcolor=#fefefe
| 548810 ||  || — || September 30, 2003 || Kitt Peak || Spacewatch ||  || align=right data-sort-value="0.52" | 520 m || 
|-id=811 bgcolor=#E9E9E9
| 548811 ||  || — || November 10, 2010 || Mount Lemmon || Mount Lemmon Survey ||  || align=right | 2.3 km || 
|-id=812 bgcolor=#E9E9E9
| 548812 ||  || — || October 17, 2001 || Palomar || NEAT ||  || align=right | 2.0 km || 
|-id=813 bgcolor=#E9E9E9
| 548813 ||  || — || April 13, 2012 || Haleakala || Pan-STARRS ||  || align=right | 1.6 km || 
|-id=814 bgcolor=#E9E9E9
| 548814 ||  || — || May 19, 2004 || Kitt Peak || Spacewatch ||  || align=right | 1.9 km || 
|-id=815 bgcolor=#E9E9E9
| 548815 ||  || — || November 8, 2010 || Mount Lemmon || Mount Lemmon Survey ||  || align=right | 1.5 km || 
|-id=816 bgcolor=#d6d6d6
| 548816 ||  || — || December 1, 2005 || Kitt Peak || Spacewatch || THM || align=right | 1.6 km || 
|-id=817 bgcolor=#E9E9E9
| 548817 ||  || — || May 28, 2004 || Kitt Peak || Spacewatch ||  || align=right | 1.7 km || 
|-id=818 bgcolor=#E9E9E9
| 548818 ||  || — || November 13, 2010 || Mount Lemmon || Mount Lemmon Survey ||  || align=right | 1.3 km || 
|-id=819 bgcolor=#C2FFFF
| 548819 ||  || — || January 25, 2014 || Haleakala || Pan-STARRS || L4 || align=right | 7.3 km || 
|-id=820 bgcolor=#E9E9E9
| 548820 ||  || — || November 2, 2010 || Mount Lemmon || Mount Lemmon Survey ||  || align=right | 1.8 km || 
|-id=821 bgcolor=#E9E9E9
| 548821 ||  || — || November 3, 2010 || Mount Lemmon || Mount Lemmon Survey ||  || align=right | 1.4 km || 
|-id=822 bgcolor=#E9E9E9
| 548822 ||  || — || May 8, 2013 || Haleakala || Pan-STARRS ||  || align=right data-sort-value="0.78" | 780 m || 
|-id=823 bgcolor=#E9E9E9
| 548823 ||  || — || November 13, 2010 || Mount Lemmon || Mount Lemmon Survey ||  || align=right | 1.2 km || 
|-id=824 bgcolor=#E9E9E9
| 548824 ||  || — || November 8, 2010 || Kitt Peak || Spacewatch ||  || align=right | 2.4 km || 
|-id=825 bgcolor=#E9E9E9
| 548825 ||  || — || September 19, 2014 || Haleakala || Pan-STARRS ||  || align=right data-sort-value="0.86" | 860 m || 
|-id=826 bgcolor=#E9E9E9
| 548826 ||  || — || November 20, 2001 || Socorro || LINEAR ||  || align=right | 1.8 km || 
|-id=827 bgcolor=#E9E9E9
| 548827 ||  || — || November 12, 2010 || Mount Lemmon || Mount Lemmon Survey ||  || align=right | 1.4 km || 
|-id=828 bgcolor=#E9E9E9
| 548828 ||  || — || November 5, 2010 || Kitt Peak || Spacewatch ||  || align=right | 2.2 km || 
|-id=829 bgcolor=#d6d6d6
| 548829 ||  || — || April 30, 2014 || Haleakala || Pan-STARRS ||  || align=right | 1.7 km || 
|-id=830 bgcolor=#d6d6d6
| 548830 ||  || — || October 12, 2010 || Mount Lemmon || Mount Lemmon Survey ||  || align=right | 1.9 km || 
|-id=831 bgcolor=#C2FFFF
| 548831 ||  || — || November 12, 2010 || Mount Lemmon || Mount Lemmon Survey || L4 || align=right | 7.8 km || 
|-id=832 bgcolor=#E9E9E9
| 548832 ||  || — || January 1, 2012 || Mount Lemmon || Mount Lemmon Survey ||  || align=right | 1.7 km || 
|-id=833 bgcolor=#E9E9E9
| 548833 ||  || — || January 21, 2012 || Kitt Peak || Spacewatch ||  || align=right | 1.8 km || 
|-id=834 bgcolor=#fefefe
| 548834 ||  || — || November 2, 2010 || Mount Lemmon || Mount Lemmon Survey ||  || align=right data-sort-value="0.52" | 520 m || 
|-id=835 bgcolor=#fefefe
| 548835 ||  || — || November 13, 2010 || Mount Lemmon || Mount Lemmon Survey ||  || align=right data-sort-value="0.62" | 620 m || 
|-id=836 bgcolor=#E9E9E9
| 548836 ||  || — || November 11, 2010 || Mount Lemmon || Mount Lemmon Survey ||  || align=right | 1.4 km || 
|-id=837 bgcolor=#E9E9E9
| 548837 ||  || — || November 10, 2010 || Kitt Peak || Spacewatch ||  || align=right | 1.5 km || 
|-id=838 bgcolor=#d6d6d6
| 548838 ||  || — || November 1, 2010 || Mount Lemmon || Mount Lemmon Survey ||  || align=right | 4.3 km || 
|-id=839 bgcolor=#d6d6d6
| 548839 ||  || — || November 13, 2010 || Mount Lemmon || Mount Lemmon Survey ||  || align=right | 2.2 km || 
|-id=840 bgcolor=#E9E9E9
| 548840 ||  || — || November 8, 2010 || XuYi || PMO NEO ||  || align=right | 1.8 km || 
|-id=841 bgcolor=#d6d6d6
| 548841 ||  || — || November 15, 2010 || Mount Lemmon || Mount Lemmon Survey ||  || align=right | 2.4 km || 
|-id=842 bgcolor=#d6d6d6
| 548842 ||  || — || November 1, 2010 || Mount Lemmon || Mount Lemmon Survey ||  || align=right | 2.1 km || 
|-id=843 bgcolor=#E9E9E9
| 548843 ||  || — || October 28, 2010 || Mount Lemmon || Mount Lemmon Survey ||  || align=right | 1.8 km || 
|-id=844 bgcolor=#E9E9E9
| 548844 ||  || — || November 1, 2010 || Kitt Peak || Spacewatch ||  || align=right | 1.8 km || 
|-id=845 bgcolor=#d6d6d6
| 548845 ||  || — || December 2, 2005 || Kitt Peak || Spacewatch ||  || align=right | 1.7 km || 
|-id=846 bgcolor=#E9E9E9
| 548846 ||  || — || November 16, 2010 || Mount Lemmon || Mount Lemmon Survey ||  || align=right | 2.1 km || 
|-id=847 bgcolor=#E9E9E9
| 548847 ||  || — || November 10, 2010 || Mount Lemmon || Mount Lemmon Survey ||  || align=right | 1.9 km || 
|-id=848 bgcolor=#E9E9E9
| 548848 ||  || — || September 5, 2010 || Mount Lemmon || Mount Lemmon Survey ||  || align=right | 1.8 km || 
|-id=849 bgcolor=#E9E9E9
| 548849 ||  || — || November 27, 2010 || Mount Lemmon || Mount Lemmon Survey ||  || align=right | 1.9 km || 
|-id=850 bgcolor=#E9E9E9
| 548850 ||  || — || April 14, 2008 || Mount Lemmon || Mount Lemmon Survey ||  || align=right | 2.0 km || 
|-id=851 bgcolor=#E9E9E9
| 548851 ||  || — || November 27, 2010 || Mount Lemmon || Mount Lemmon Survey ||  || align=right | 1.5 km || 
|-id=852 bgcolor=#fefefe
| 548852 ||  || — || November 27, 2010 || Mount Lemmon || Mount Lemmon Survey ||  || align=right data-sort-value="0.62" | 620 m || 
|-id=853 bgcolor=#E9E9E9
| 548853 ||  || — || November 10, 2010 || Mount Lemmon || Mount Lemmon Survey ||  || align=right | 1.6 km || 
|-id=854 bgcolor=#E9E9E9
| 548854 ||  || — || November 27, 2010 || Mount Lemmon || Mount Lemmon Survey ||  || align=right | 1.5 km || 
|-id=855 bgcolor=#E9E9E9
| 548855 ||  || — || September 4, 2010 || Kitt Peak || Spacewatch ||  || align=right | 2.2 km || 
|-id=856 bgcolor=#E9E9E9
| 548856 ||  || — || November 20, 2001 || Kitt Peak || Spacewatch ||  || align=right | 2.2 km || 
|-id=857 bgcolor=#E9E9E9
| 548857 ||  || — || November 27, 2010 || Mount Lemmon || Mount Lemmon Survey ||  || align=right | 1.8 km || 
|-id=858 bgcolor=#E9E9E9
| 548858 ||  || — || November 27, 2010 || Mount Lemmon || Mount Lemmon Survey ||  || align=right | 1.8 km || 
|-id=859 bgcolor=#fefefe
| 548859 ||  || — || November 27, 2010 || Mount Lemmon || Mount Lemmon Survey ||  || align=right data-sort-value="0.68" | 680 m || 
|-id=860 bgcolor=#fefefe
| 548860 ||  || — || November 12, 2010 || Kitt Peak || Spacewatch ||  || align=right data-sort-value="0.54" | 540 m || 
|-id=861 bgcolor=#E9E9E9
| 548861 ||  || — || October 1, 2005 || Mount Lemmon || Mount Lemmon Survey ||  || align=right | 1.9 km || 
|-id=862 bgcolor=#E9E9E9
| 548862 ||  || — || October 13, 2010 || Mount Lemmon || Mount Lemmon Survey ||  || align=right | 1.8 km || 
|-id=863 bgcolor=#fefefe
| 548863 ||  || — || December 19, 2004 || Mount Lemmon || Mount Lemmon Survey ||  || align=right data-sort-value="0.71" | 710 m || 
|-id=864 bgcolor=#fefefe
| 548864 ||  || — || February 2, 2005 || Kitt Peak || Spacewatch ||  || align=right data-sort-value="0.65" | 650 m || 
|-id=865 bgcolor=#E9E9E9
| 548865 ||  || — || November 27, 2010 || Mount Lemmon || Mount Lemmon Survey ||  || align=right | 1.5 km || 
|-id=866 bgcolor=#E9E9E9
| 548866 ||  || — || November 27, 2010 || Mount Lemmon || Mount Lemmon Survey ||  || align=right | 1.8 km || 
|-id=867 bgcolor=#d6d6d6
| 548867 ||  || — || October 29, 2010 || Mount Lemmon || Mount Lemmon Survey ||  || align=right | 2.2 km || 
|-id=868 bgcolor=#E9E9E9
| 548868 ||  || — || November 8, 2010 || Kitt Peak || Spacewatch ||  || align=right | 2.0 km || 
|-id=869 bgcolor=#E9E9E9
| 548869 ||  || — || November 30, 2010 || Mount Lemmon || Mount Lemmon Survey ||  || align=right | 1.9 km || 
|-id=870 bgcolor=#E9E9E9
| 548870 ||  || — || November 11, 2010 || Mount Lemmon || Mount Lemmon Survey ||  || align=right | 2.0 km || 
|-id=871 bgcolor=#E9E9E9
| 548871 ||  || — || October 14, 2010 || Mount Lemmon || Mount Lemmon Survey ||  || align=right | 1.9 km || 
|-id=872 bgcolor=#d6d6d6
| 548872 ||  || — || November 8, 2010 || Kitt Peak || Spacewatch ||  || align=right | 2.5 km || 
|-id=873 bgcolor=#E9E9E9
| 548873 ||  || — || November 28, 2010 || Mount Lemmon || Mount Lemmon Survey ||  || align=right | 2.0 km || 
|-id=874 bgcolor=#E9E9E9
| 548874 ||  || — || November 10, 2010 || Mount Lemmon || Mount Lemmon Survey ||  || align=right | 1.8 km || 
|-id=875 bgcolor=#E9E9E9
| 548875 ||  || — || June 12, 2013 || Haleakala || Pan-STARRS ||  || align=right | 1.4 km || 
|-id=876 bgcolor=#fefefe
| 548876 ||  || — || November 30, 2010 || Mount Lemmon || Mount Lemmon Survey ||  || align=right data-sort-value="0.86" | 860 m || 
|-id=877 bgcolor=#fefefe
| 548877 ||  || — || November 27, 2010 || Mount Lemmon || Mount Lemmon Survey ||  || align=right data-sort-value="0.54" | 540 m || 
|-id=878 bgcolor=#E9E9E9
| 548878 ||  || — || January 10, 2007 || Kitt Peak || Spacewatch ||  || align=right | 1.9 km || 
|-id=879 bgcolor=#E9E9E9
| 548879 ||  || — || December 18, 2015 || Kitt Peak || Spacewatch ||  || align=right | 1.9 km || 
|-id=880 bgcolor=#E9E9E9
| 548880 ||  || — || November 6, 2010 || Mount Lemmon || Mount Lemmon Survey ||  || align=right | 1.8 km || 
|-id=881 bgcolor=#E9E9E9
| 548881 ||  || — || December 1, 2010 || Mount Lemmon || Mount Lemmon Survey ||  || align=right | 1.8 km || 
|-id=882 bgcolor=#E9E9E9
| 548882 ||  || — || December 1, 2010 || Kitt Peak || Spacewatch ||  || align=right | 1.8 km || 
|-id=883 bgcolor=#E9E9E9
| 548883 ||  || — || December 2, 2010 || Mount Lemmon || Mount Lemmon Survey ||  || align=right | 1.9 km || 
|-id=884 bgcolor=#E9E9E9
| 548884 ||  || — || August 30, 2005 || Kitt Peak || Spacewatch ||  || align=right | 1.4 km || 
|-id=885 bgcolor=#E9E9E9
| 548885 ||  || — || December 1, 2010 || Mount Lemmon || Mount Lemmon Survey ||  || align=right | 2.1 km || 
|-id=886 bgcolor=#E9E9E9
| 548886 ||  || — || November 3, 2010 || La Sagra || OAM Obs. ||  || align=right | 1.8 km || 
|-id=887 bgcolor=#E9E9E9
| 548887 ||  || — || October 10, 2005 || Kitt Peak || Spacewatch ||  || align=right | 2.2 km || 
|-id=888 bgcolor=#fefefe
| 548888 ||  || — || December 2, 2010 || Kitt Peak || Spacewatch ||  || align=right data-sort-value="0.65" | 650 m || 
|-id=889 bgcolor=#E9E9E9
| 548889 ||  || — || September 25, 2001 || Socorro || LINEAR || ADE || align=right | 2.3 km || 
|-id=890 bgcolor=#E9E9E9
| 548890 ||  || — || January 27, 2007 || Mount Lemmon || Mount Lemmon Survey ||  || align=right | 1.5 km || 
|-id=891 bgcolor=#E9E9E9
| 548891 ||  || — || December 5, 2010 || Mount Lemmon || Mount Lemmon Survey ||  || align=right | 1.4 km || 
|-id=892 bgcolor=#E9E9E9
| 548892 ||  || — || October 22, 2006 || Mount Lemmon || Mount Lemmon Survey ||  || align=right | 1.8 km || 
|-id=893 bgcolor=#E9E9E9
| 548893 ||  || — || November 27, 2010 || Catalina || CSS ||  || align=right | 2.1 km || 
|-id=894 bgcolor=#E9E9E9
| 548894 ||  || — || December 1, 2010 || Mount Lemmon || Mount Lemmon Survey ||  || align=right | 2.1 km || 
|-id=895 bgcolor=#fefefe
| 548895 ||  || — || March 9, 2005 || Mount Lemmon || Mount Lemmon Survey ||  || align=right data-sort-value="0.57" | 570 m || 
|-id=896 bgcolor=#E9E9E9
| 548896 ||  || — || November 8, 2010 || Mount Lemmon || Mount Lemmon Survey ||  || align=right | 1.5 km || 
|-id=897 bgcolor=#E9E9E9
| 548897 ||  || — || April 30, 2009 || Mount Lemmon || Mount Lemmon Survey ||  || align=right | 1.9 km || 
|-id=898 bgcolor=#E9E9E9
| 548898 ||  || — || December 13, 2006 || Kitt Peak || Spacewatch ||  || align=right | 1.5 km || 
|-id=899 bgcolor=#E9E9E9
| 548899 ||  || — || December 3, 2010 || Mount Lemmon || Mount Lemmon Survey ||  || align=right | 1.4 km || 
|-id=900 bgcolor=#E9E9E9
| 548900 ||  || — || December 3, 2010 || Mount Lemmon || Mount Lemmon Survey ||  || align=right | 1.7 km || 
|}

548901–549000 

|-bgcolor=#E9E9E9
| 548901 ||  || — || August 14, 2001 || Palomar || NEAT ||  || align=right | 2.0 km || 
|-id=902 bgcolor=#E9E9E9
| 548902 ||  || — || December 21, 2006 || Kitt Peak || Spacewatch ||  || align=right | 1.8 km || 
|-id=903 bgcolor=#E9E9E9
| 548903 ||  || — || September 11, 2010 || Kitt Peak || Spacewatch ||  || align=right | 1.4 km || 
|-id=904 bgcolor=#E9E9E9
| 548904 ||  || — || December 6, 2010 || Catalina || CSS ||  || align=right | 1.9 km || 
|-id=905 bgcolor=#E9E9E9
| 548905 ||  || — || December 8, 2010 || Kitt Peak || Spacewatch ||  || align=right | 2.2 km || 
|-id=906 bgcolor=#fefefe
| 548906 ||  || — || November 26, 2010 || Mount Lemmon || Mount Lemmon Survey ||  || align=right data-sort-value="0.53" | 530 m || 
|-id=907 bgcolor=#E9E9E9
| 548907 ||  || — || November 5, 2010 || Kitt Peak || Spacewatch ||  || align=right | 1.5 km || 
|-id=908 bgcolor=#E9E9E9
| 548908 ||  || — || September 21, 2009 || Catalina || CSS ||  || align=right | 2.8 km || 
|-id=909 bgcolor=#E9E9E9
| 548909 ||  || — || November 10, 2010 || Mount Lemmon || Mount Lemmon Survey ||  || align=right | 1.2 km || 
|-id=910 bgcolor=#E9E9E9
| 548910 ||  || — || October 10, 2001 || Palomar || NEAT ||  || align=right | 1.7 km || 
|-id=911 bgcolor=#E9E9E9
| 548911 ||  || — || July 29, 2009 || Kitt Peak || Spacewatch ||  || align=right | 2.0 km || 
|-id=912 bgcolor=#E9E9E9
| 548912 ||  || — || July 30, 2000 || Cerro Tololo || M. W. Buie, S. D. Kern ||  || align=right | 1.5 km || 
|-id=913 bgcolor=#fefefe
| 548913 ||  || — || December 30, 2000 || Socorro || LINEAR ||  || align=right | 1.1 km || 
|-id=914 bgcolor=#E9E9E9
| 548914 ||  || — || December 3, 2010 || Mount Lemmon || Mount Lemmon Survey ||  || align=right | 2.1 km || 
|-id=915 bgcolor=#E9E9E9
| 548915 ||  || — || March 10, 2008 || Mount Lemmon || Mount Lemmon Survey ||  || align=right | 1.8 km || 
|-id=916 bgcolor=#E9E9E9
| 548916 ||  || — || October 1, 2005 || Catalina || CSS ||  || align=right | 2.3 km || 
|-id=917 bgcolor=#E9E9E9
| 548917 ||  || — || April 20, 2004 || Kitt Peak || Spacewatch ||  || align=right | 2.1 km || 
|-id=918 bgcolor=#E9E9E9
| 548918 ||  || — || December 4, 2010 || Mount Lemmon || Mount Lemmon Survey ||  || align=right | 2.1 km || 
|-id=919 bgcolor=#fefefe
| 548919 ||  || — || December 11, 2010 || Mount Lemmon || Mount Lemmon Survey || H || align=right data-sort-value="0.47" | 470 m || 
|-id=920 bgcolor=#E9E9E9
| 548920 ||  || — || March 12, 2008 || Kitt Peak || Spacewatch ||  || align=right | 2.4 km || 
|-id=921 bgcolor=#fefefe
| 548921 ||  || — || December 3, 2010 || Mount Lemmon || Mount Lemmon Survey ||  || align=right data-sort-value="0.62" | 620 m || 
|-id=922 bgcolor=#E9E9E9
| 548922 ||  || — || October 2, 2005 || Palomar || NEAT ||  || align=right | 2.8 km || 
|-id=923 bgcolor=#E9E9E9
| 548923 ||  || — || May 23, 2001 || Cerro Tololo || J. L. Elliot, L. H. Wasserman ||  || align=right data-sort-value="0.98" | 980 m || 
|-id=924 bgcolor=#E9E9E9
| 548924 ||  || — || December 14, 2010 || Mount Lemmon || Mount Lemmon Survey ||  || align=right | 1.8 km || 
|-id=925 bgcolor=#E9E9E9
| 548925 ||  || — || November 12, 2010 || Mount Lemmon || Mount Lemmon Survey ||  || align=right | 1.6 km || 
|-id=926 bgcolor=#E9E9E9
| 548926 ||  || — || April 13, 2013 || Haleakala || Pan-STARRS ||  || align=right | 1.1 km || 
|-id=927 bgcolor=#d6d6d6
| 548927 ||  || — || December 5, 2010 || Mount Lemmon || Mount Lemmon Survey ||  || align=right | 2.8 km || 
|-id=928 bgcolor=#E9E9E9
| 548928 ||  || — || May 1, 2013 || Mount Lemmon || Mount Lemmon Survey ||  || align=right | 1.1 km || 
|-id=929 bgcolor=#fefefe
| 548929 ||  || — || January 20, 2015 || Haleakala || Pan-STARRS ||  || align=right data-sort-value="0.63" | 630 m || 
|-id=930 bgcolor=#d6d6d6
| 548930 ||  || — || November 1, 2010 || Kitt Peak || Spacewatch ||  || align=right | 2.2 km || 
|-id=931 bgcolor=#E9E9E9
| 548931 ||  || — || December 2, 2010 || Mount Lemmon || Mount Lemmon Survey ||  || align=right | 1.7 km || 
|-id=932 bgcolor=#E9E9E9
| 548932 ||  || — || December 10, 2010 || Mount Lemmon || Mount Lemmon Survey ||  || align=right | 2.0 km || 
|-id=933 bgcolor=#fefefe
| 548933 ||  || — || December 6, 2010 || Mount Lemmon || Mount Lemmon Survey ||  || align=right data-sort-value="0.59" | 590 m || 
|-id=934 bgcolor=#E9E9E9
| 548934 ||  || — || March 12, 2012 || Kitt Peak || Spacewatch ||  || align=right | 2.0 km || 
|-id=935 bgcolor=#E9E9E9
| 548935 ||  || — || April 26, 2017 || Haleakala || Pan-STARRS ||  || align=right | 1.8 km || 
|-id=936 bgcolor=#fefefe
| 548936 ||  || — || October 27, 2013 || Kitt Peak || Spacewatch ||  || align=right data-sort-value="0.62" | 620 m || 
|-id=937 bgcolor=#E9E9E9
| 548937 ||  || — || March 13, 2012 || Mount Lemmon || Mount Lemmon Survey ||  || align=right | 1.8 km || 
|-id=938 bgcolor=#d6d6d6
| 548938 ||  || — || December 10, 2010 || Mount Lemmon || Mount Lemmon Survey ||  || align=right | 2.1 km || 
|-id=939 bgcolor=#fefefe
| 548939 ||  || — || December 21, 2003 || Kitt Peak || Spacewatch ||  || align=right data-sort-value="0.59" | 590 m || 
|-id=940 bgcolor=#E9E9E9
| 548940 ||  || — || December 25, 2010 || Mount Lemmon || Mount Lemmon Survey ||  || align=right | 2.1 km || 
|-id=941 bgcolor=#E9E9E9
| 548941 ||  || — || August 16, 2009 || Kitt Peak || Spacewatch ||  || align=right | 3.1 km || 
|-id=942 bgcolor=#E9E9E9
| 548942 ||  || — || November 15, 2010 || Mount Lemmon || Mount Lemmon Survey ||  || align=right | 2.0 km || 
|-id=943 bgcolor=#d6d6d6
| 548943 ||  || — || December 29, 2000 || Haleakala || AMOS ||  || align=right | 4.2 km || 
|-id=944 bgcolor=#fefefe
| 548944 ||  || — || September 20, 2003 || Palomar || NEAT ||  || align=right data-sort-value="0.90" | 900 m || 
|-id=945 bgcolor=#E9E9E9
| 548945 ||  || — || January 2, 2011 || Mount Lemmon || Mount Lemmon Survey ||  || align=right | 1.8 km || 
|-id=946 bgcolor=#fefefe
| 548946 ||  || — || December 14, 2010 || Mount Lemmon || Mount Lemmon Survey ||  || align=right data-sort-value="0.71" | 710 m || 
|-id=947 bgcolor=#FA8072
| 548947 ||  || — || January 21, 2001 || Socorro || LINEAR ||  || align=right data-sort-value="0.78" | 780 m || 
|-id=948 bgcolor=#E9E9E9
| 548948 ||  || — || December 2, 2010 || Kitt Peak || Spacewatch ||  || align=right | 2.3 km || 
|-id=949 bgcolor=#d6d6d6
| 548949 ||  || — || December 1, 2005 || Palomar || NEAT ||  || align=right | 2.7 km || 
|-id=950 bgcolor=#E9E9E9
| 548950 ||  || — || January 24, 2003 || Palomar || NEAT ||  || align=right | 1.7 km || 
|-id=951 bgcolor=#fefefe
| 548951 ||  || — || April 2, 2005 || Kitt Peak || Spacewatch ||  || align=right data-sort-value="0.59" | 590 m || 
|-id=952 bgcolor=#fefefe
| 548952 ||  || — || January 9, 2011 || Mount Lemmon || Mount Lemmon Survey || H || align=right data-sort-value="0.68" | 680 m || 
|-id=953 bgcolor=#fefefe
| 548953 ||  || — || November 15, 2010 || Mount Lemmon || Mount Lemmon Survey ||  || align=right data-sort-value="0.87" | 870 m || 
|-id=954 bgcolor=#fefefe
| 548954 ||  || — || January 3, 2011 || Catalina || CSS || H || align=right data-sort-value="0.62" | 620 m || 
|-id=955 bgcolor=#d6d6d6
| 548955 ||  || — || January 3, 2011 || Mount Lemmon || Mount Lemmon Survey ||  || align=right | 2.4 km || 
|-id=956 bgcolor=#FA8072
| 548956 ||  || — || July 8, 2005 || Kitt Peak || Spacewatch ||  || align=right | 1.7 km || 
|-id=957 bgcolor=#E9E9E9
| 548957 ||  || — || January 11, 2011 || Kitt Peak || Spacewatch ||  || align=right | 2.2 km || 
|-id=958 bgcolor=#fefefe
| 548958 ||  || — || August 3, 2000 || Kitt Peak || Spacewatch ||  || align=right data-sort-value="0.62" | 620 m || 
|-id=959 bgcolor=#E9E9E9
| 548959 ||  || — || January 10, 2011 || Mount Lemmon || Mount Lemmon Survey ||  || align=right | 2.3 km || 
|-id=960 bgcolor=#fefefe
| 548960 ||  || — || October 21, 2003 || Palomar || NEAT ||  || align=right data-sort-value="0.75" | 750 m || 
|-id=961 bgcolor=#fefefe
| 548961 ||  || — || November 19, 2003 || Palomar || NEAT ||  || align=right data-sort-value="0.90" | 900 m || 
|-id=962 bgcolor=#fefefe
| 548962 ||  || — || October 20, 2006 || Mount Lemmon || Mount Lemmon Survey ||  || align=right data-sort-value="0.86" | 860 m || 
|-id=963 bgcolor=#fefefe
| 548963 ||  || — || September 25, 2006 || Mount Lemmon || Mount Lemmon Survey ||  || align=right data-sort-value="0.78" | 780 m || 
|-id=964 bgcolor=#E9E9E9
| 548964 ||  || — || August 23, 2004 || Kitt Peak || Spacewatch ||  || align=right | 2.2 km || 
|-id=965 bgcolor=#E9E9E9
| 548965 ||  || — || January 13, 2011 || Mount Lemmon || Mount Lemmon Survey ||  || align=right | 2.2 km || 
|-id=966 bgcolor=#d6d6d6
| 548966 ||  || — || September 18, 2003 || Kitt Peak || Spacewatch ||  || align=right | 2.7 km || 
|-id=967 bgcolor=#fefefe
| 548967 ||  || — || November 26, 2003 || Kitt Peak || Spacewatch ||  || align=right data-sort-value="0.57" | 570 m || 
|-id=968 bgcolor=#fefefe
| 548968 ||  || — || October 22, 2003 || Apache Point || SDSS Collaboration ||  || align=right data-sort-value="0.59" | 590 m || 
|-id=969 bgcolor=#fefefe
| 548969 ||  || — || January 19, 2001 || Kitt Peak || Spacewatch ||  || align=right data-sort-value="0.90" | 900 m || 
|-id=970 bgcolor=#d6d6d6
| 548970 ||  || — || January 14, 2011 || Kitt Peak || Spacewatch ||  || align=right | 3.0 km || 
|-id=971 bgcolor=#fefefe
| 548971 ||  || — || March 15, 2004 || Kitt Peak || Spacewatch ||  || align=right data-sort-value="0.90" | 900 m || 
|-id=972 bgcolor=#d6d6d6
| 548972 ||  || — || September 5, 2008 || Kitt Peak || Spacewatch ||  || align=right | 3.3 km || 
|-id=973 bgcolor=#fefefe
| 548973 ||  || — || July 25, 2003 || Palomar || NEAT ||  || align=right data-sort-value="0.71" | 710 m || 
|-id=974 bgcolor=#fefefe
| 548974 ||  || — || October 13, 2013 || Mount Lemmon || Mount Lemmon Survey ||  || align=right data-sort-value="0.82" | 820 m || 
|-id=975 bgcolor=#d6d6d6
| 548975 ||  || — || January 13, 2011 || Mount Lemmon || Mount Lemmon Survey ||  || align=right | 3.1 km || 
|-id=976 bgcolor=#E9E9E9
| 548976 ||  || — || August 25, 2014 || Haleakala || Pan-STARRS ||  || align=right | 1.9 km || 
|-id=977 bgcolor=#fefefe
| 548977 ||  || — || December 5, 2010 || Kitt Peak || Spacewatch ||  || align=right data-sort-value="0.57" | 570 m || 
|-id=978 bgcolor=#d6d6d6
| 548978 ||  || — || January 12, 2011 || Mount Lemmon || Mount Lemmon Survey ||  || align=right | 2.7 km || 
|-id=979 bgcolor=#fefefe
| 548979 ||  || — || January 8, 2011 || Mount Lemmon || Mount Lemmon Survey ||  || align=right data-sort-value="0.78" | 780 m || 
|-id=980 bgcolor=#fefefe
| 548980 ||  || — || November 22, 2006 || Kitt Peak || Spacewatch ||  || align=right data-sort-value="0.71" | 710 m || 
|-id=981 bgcolor=#d6d6d6
| 548981 ||  || — || December 19, 2015 || Mount Lemmon || Mount Lemmon Survey ||  || align=right | 2.3 km || 
|-id=982 bgcolor=#E9E9E9
| 548982 ||  || — || May 19, 2017 || Mount Lemmon || Mount Lemmon Survey ||  || align=right | 1.4 km || 
|-id=983 bgcolor=#fefefe
| 548983 ||  || — || February 10, 2015 || Mount Lemmon || Mount Lemmon Survey ||  || align=right data-sort-value="0.62" | 620 m || 
|-id=984 bgcolor=#d6d6d6
| 548984 ||  || — || October 28, 2014 || Haleakala || Pan-STARRS ||  || align=right | 2.4 km || 
|-id=985 bgcolor=#fefefe
| 548985 ||  || — || March 8, 2005 || Kitt Peak || Spacewatch ||  || align=right data-sort-value="0.86" | 860 m || 
|-id=986 bgcolor=#E9E9E9
| 548986 ||  || — || January 8, 2011 || Mount Lemmon || Mount Lemmon Survey ||  || align=right | 1.9 km || 
|-id=987 bgcolor=#E9E9E9
| 548987 ||  || — || January 2, 2011 || Mount Lemmon || Mount Lemmon Survey ||  || align=right | 2.0 km || 
|-id=988 bgcolor=#E9E9E9
| 548988 ||  || — || January 2, 2011 || Mount Lemmon || Mount Lemmon Survey ||  || align=right | 1.7 km || 
|-id=989 bgcolor=#E9E9E9
| 548989 ||  || — || January 10, 2011 || Kitt Peak || Spacewatch ||  || align=right | 1.7 km || 
|-id=990 bgcolor=#fefefe
| 548990 ||  || — || January 14, 2011 || Mount Lemmon || Mount Lemmon Survey ||  || align=right data-sort-value="0.71" | 710 m || 
|-id=991 bgcolor=#fefefe
| 548991 ||  || — || April 8, 2008 || Kitt Peak || Spacewatch ||  || align=right data-sort-value="0.71" | 710 m || 
|-id=992 bgcolor=#E9E9E9
| 548992 ||  || — || January 16, 2011 || Mount Lemmon || Mount Lemmon Survey ||  || align=right | 1.8 km || 
|-id=993 bgcolor=#d6d6d6
| 548993 ||  || — || January 16, 2011 || Mount Lemmon || Mount Lemmon Survey ||  || align=right | 1.8 km || 
|-id=994 bgcolor=#E9E9E9
| 548994 ||  || — || March 8, 2003 || Kitt Peak || Spacewatch ||  || align=right | 2.3 km || 
|-id=995 bgcolor=#E9E9E9
| 548995 ||  || — || January 13, 2011 || Kitt Peak || Spacewatch ||  || align=right | 2.0 km || 
|-id=996 bgcolor=#fefefe
| 548996 ||  || — || August 17, 2006 || Palomar || NEAT ||  || align=right data-sort-value="0.90" | 900 m || 
|-id=997 bgcolor=#fefefe
| 548997 ||  || — || January 13, 2011 || Kitt Peak || Spacewatch || H || align=right data-sort-value="0.62" | 620 m || 
|-id=998 bgcolor=#d6d6d6
| 548998 ||  || — || February 24, 2006 || Palomar || NEAT ||  || align=right | 2.5 km || 
|-id=999 bgcolor=#fefefe
| 548999 ||  || — || January 23, 2011 || Mount Lemmon || Mount Lemmon Survey ||  || align=right data-sort-value="0.60" | 600 m || 
|-id=000 bgcolor=#fefefe
| 549000 ||  || — || November 10, 2006 || Kitt Peak || Spacewatch ||  || align=right data-sort-value="0.68" | 680 m || 
|}

References

External links 
 Discovery Circumstances: Numbered Minor Planets (545001)–(550000) (IAU Minor Planet Center)

0548